= Mu problem =

Problem of supersymmetric theories

In theoretical physics, the μ problem is a problem of supersymmetric theories, concerned with understanding the parameters of the theory.

== Background ==
The supersymmetric Higgs mass parameter μ appears as the following term in the superpotential: μ H_{u} H_{d}. It is necessary to provide a mass for the fermionic superpartners of the Higgs bosons, i.e. the higgsinos, and it enters as well the scalar potential of the Higgs bosons.

To ensure that H_{u} and H_{d} get a non-zero vacuum expectation value after electroweak symmetry breaking, μ should be of the order of magnitude of the electroweak scale, many orders of magnitude smaller than the Planck scale (M_{pl}), which is the natural cutoff scale. This brings about a problem of naturalness: Why is that scale so much smaller than the cutoff scale? And why, if the μ term in the superpotential has different physical origins, do the corresponding scale happen to fall so close to each other?

Before LHC, it was thought that the soft supersymmetry breaking terms should also be of the same order of magnitude as the electroweak scale. This was negated by the Higgs mass measurements and limits on supersymmetry models.

One proposed solution, known as the Giudice–Masiero mechanism, is that this term does not appear explicitly in the Lagrangian, because it violates some global symmetry, and can therefore be created only via spontaneous breaking of this symmetry. This is proposed to happen together with F-term supersymmetry breaking, with a spurious field X that parameterizes the hidden supersymmetry-breaking sector of the theory (meaning that F_{X} is the non-zero F-term).

Let us assume that the Kahler potential includes a term of the form $\ \frac{X}{\ M_\mathsf{pl}\ }\ H_\mathsf{u}\ H_\mathsf{d}\$ times some dimensionless coefficient, which is naturally of order one, and where M_{pl} is Planck mass. Then as supersymmetry breaks, F_{X} gets a non-zero vacuum expectation value ⟨F_{X}⟩ and the following effective term is added to the superpotential: $\ \frac{\ \langle F_\mathsf{X} \rangle\ }{\ M_\mathsf{pl}\ }\ H_\mathsf{u}\ H_\mathsf{d}\ ,$ which gives a measured $\ \mu = \frac{\ \langle F_\mathsf{X} \rangle\ }{\ M_\mathsf{pl}\ }\ .$ On the other hand, soft supersymmetry breaking terms are similarly created and also have a natural scale of $\ \frac{\ \langle F_\mathsf{X} \rangle\ }{\ M_\mathsf{pl}\ }\ .$

== See also ==
- NMSSM (Next-to-Minimal Supersymmetric Standard Model)
- Minimal Supersymmetric Standard Model
- Doublet–triplet splitting problem
- Hierarchy problem
- Little hierarchy problem
