= Photino =

Hypothetical superpartner of the photon

- Composition: Elementary particle
- Statistics: Fermionic
- Family: Fermion
- Interactions: Electromagnetic
- Status: Hypothetical
- Symbol: γ͂
- Electric charge: 0 e
- Spin: 1/2

A photino is a hypothetical subatomic particle, the fermion WIMP superpartner of the photon predicted by supersymmetry. It is an example of a gaugino. Even though no photino has ever been observed so far, it is one of the candidates for the lightest supersymmetric particle in the universe. It is proposed that photinos are produced by sources of ultra-high-energy cosmic rays.

== Photino numbers ==
Photinos have a lepton number 0, baryon number 0, and spin 1/2. With an R-parity of −1 it is a possible candidate for dark matter. It mixes with the superpartners of the Z boson (zino) and the neutral higgs (higgsino) to form the neutralino.

== See also ==
- Supersymmetry – Symmetry between bosons and fermions
- Photon – Elementary particle or quantum of light
- Dual photon – Hypothetical particle dual to the photon
- Electromagnetism – Fundamental interaction between charged particles
