= Stop squark =

Superpartner of the top quark

In particle physics, a stop squark, symbol t͂, is the superpartner of the top quark as predicted by supersymmetry (SUSY). It is a sfermion, which means it is a spin-0 boson (scalar boson). While the top quark is the heaviest known quark, the stop squark is actually often the lightest squark in many supersymmetry models.

== Overview ==
The stop squark is a key ingredient of a wide range of SUSY models that address the hierarchy problem of the Standard Model (SM) in a natural way. A boson partner to the top quark would stabilize the Higgs boson mass against quadratically divergent quantum corrections, provided its mass is close to the electroweak symmetry breaking energy scale. If this was the case then the stop squark would be accessible at the Large Hadron Collider. In the generic R-parity conserving Minimal Supersymmetric Standard Model (MSSM) the scalar partners of right-handed and left-handed top quarks mix to form two stop mass eigenstates. Depending on the specific details of the SUSY model and the mass hierarchy of the sparticles, the stop might decay into a bottom quark and a chargino, with a subsequent decay of the chargino into the lightest neutralino (which is often the lightest supersymmetric particle).

== Evidence ==
Many searches for evidence of the stop squark have been performed by both the ATLAS and CMS experiments at the LHC but so far no signal has been discovered. In January 2019, the CMS Collaboration published findings excluding stop squarks with masses as large as 1230 GeV at 95% (2σ) confidence level.

== See also ==
- List of hypothetical particles
