= Little hierarchy problem =

In particle physics the little hierarchy problem in the Minimal Supersymmetric Standard Model (MSSM) is a refinement of the hierarchy problem. According to quantum field theory, the mass of the Higgs boson must be rather light for the electroweak theory to work. However, the loop corrections to the mass are naturally much greater; this is known as the hierarchy problem. New physical effects such as supersymmetry may in principle reduce the size of the loop corrections, making the theory natural. However, it is known from experiments that new physics such as superpartners does not occur at very low energy scales, so even if these new particles reduce the loop corrections, they do not reduce them enough to make the renormalized Higgs mass completely natural. The expected value of the Higgs mass is about 10% of the size of the loop corrections which shows that a certain "little" amount of fine-tuning seems necessary.

Particle physicists have different opinions as to whether the little hierarchy problem is serious.

== Overview ==
By supersymmetrizing the Standard Model, one arrives at a hypothesized solution to the gauge hierarchy, or big hierarchy, problem in that supersymmetry guarantees cancellation of quadratic divergences to all orders in perturbation theory. The simplest supersymmetrization of the SM leads to the Minimal Supersymmetric Standard Model or MSSM. In the MSSM, each SM particle has a partner particle known as a super-partner or sparticle. For instance, the left- and right-electron helicity components have scalar partner electrons _{L} and _{R} respectively, whilst the eight colored gluons have eight colored spin-1/2 gluino superpartners. The MSSM Higgs sector must necessarily be expanded to include two rather than one doublets leading to five physical Higgs particles h, H, A and H^{±}, whilst three of the eight Higgs component fields are absorbed by the W^{±} and Z bosons to make them massive. The MSSM is actually supported by three different sets of measurements which test for the presence of virtual superpartners:

1. the celebrated weak scale measurements of the three gauge couplings strengths are just what is needed for gauge coupling unification at a scale Q ≈ 2×10^{16} GeV
2. the value of m_{t} ≈ 173 GeV falls squarely in the range needed to trigger a radiatively driven breakdown in electroweak symmetry and
3. the measured value of m_{h} ≈ 125 GeV falls within the narrow window of allowed values for the MSSM.

Nonetheless, verification of weak scale SUSY (WSS, SUSY with superpartner masses at or around the weak scale as characterized by m(W, Z, h) ≈ 100 GeV) requires the direct observation of at least some of the superpartners in sufficiently energetic colliding beam experiments. As recent as 2017, the CERN Large Hadron Collider, a p–p collider operating at centre-of-mass energy 13 TeV, has not found any evidence for superpartners. This has led to mass limits on the gluino m > 2 TeV and on the lighter top squark m_{_{1}} > 1 TeV (within the context of certain simplified models that are assumed to make the experimental analysis more tractable). Along with these limits, the rather large measured value of m_{h} ≈ 125 GeV seems to require TeV-scale highly mixed top squarks. These combined measurements have raised concern now about an emerging Little Hierarchy problem characterized by m_{W,Z,h} ≪ m_{sparticle}. Under the Little Hierarchy, one might expect the now log-divergent light Higgs mass to blow up to the sparticle mass scale unless one fine-tunes. The Little Hierarchy problem has led to concern that WSS is perhaps not realized in nature, or at least not in the manner typically expected by theorists in years past.

Researchers Cheng and Low summarize the little hierarchy problem as "the tension between the naturalness of the electroweak scale and the precision measurements showing no evidence for new physics up to 5-10 TeV".

== Status ==
In the MSSM, the light Higgs mass is calculated to be

$$m_\text{h}^2 = \mu^2 + m_{\text{H}_\text{u}}^2 + \text{mixing} + \text{loops} ,$$

where the mixing and loop contributions are below m_{h}^{2} but where in most models, the soft SUSY breaking up-Higgs mass m_{H_{u}}^{2} is driven to large, TeV-scale negative values (in order to break electroweak symmetry). Then, to maintain the measured value of m_{h} = 125 GeV, one must tune the superpotential mass term μ^{2} to some large positive value. Alternatively, for natural SUSY, one may expect that m_{H_{u}}^{2} runs to small negative values, in which case both μ and |m_{H_{u}}| are of order 100–200 GeV. This already leads to a prediction: since μ is supersymmetric and feeds mass to both SM particles (W, Z, h) and superpartners (higgsinos), then it is expected from the natural MSSM that light higgsinos exist nearby to the 100–200 GeV scale. This simple realization has profound implications for WSS collider and dark matter searches.

Naturalness in the MSSM has historically been expressed in terms of the Z-boson mass, and indeed this approach leads to more stringent upper bounds on sparticle masses. By minimizing the (Coleman-Weinberg) scalar potential of the MSSM, then one may relate the measured value of m_{Z} = 91.2 GeV to the SUSY Lagrangian parameters:

$$\frac{m_Z^2}{2}=\frac{(m_{H_d}^2+\Sigma_d^d(i))-\tan^2\beta (m_{H_u}^2+\Sigma_u^u (j))}{\tan^2\beta -1}-\mu^2\simeq -m_{H_u}^2-\Sigma_u^u (i)-\mu^2$$

Here, tan β ≈ 5–50 is the ratio of Higgs field vacuum expectation values v_{u}/v_{d} and m_{H_{d}}^{2} is the down-Higgs soft breaking mass term. The $\Sigma_d^d(i)$ and $\Sigma_u^u(j)$ contain a variety of loop corrections labelled by indices i and j, the most important of which typically comes from the top-squarks.

== See also ==
- MSSM Higgs mass
- Mu problem
