= Darkon (unparticle) =

Hypothetical unparticle

Darkon is a hypothetical scalar unparticle to introduce to the Minimal Supersymmetric Standard Model, a dark matter candidate.

== History ==
Anthony Zee and V. Silveira were the first to consider the darkon field as dark matter in 1985. This approach was then used by several others groups of physicists.

== Concept ==
In addition to the Standard Model particles, It contains the darkon, a real singlet field. To play the role of dark matter, the darkon field must interact weakly with the standard matter field sector and should not rapidly decay into particles. The simplest way of introducing the darkon is to demand that they can only be annihilated or created in pairs and to make it stable against decay.

== See also ==
- Lightest supersymmetric particle
- Physics beyond the Standard Model
- SUSY
- WIMPs
