= Gaugino =

Hypothetical subatomic particle predicted by supersymmetry

In supersymmetry theories of particle physics, a gaugino /ɡeɪˈdʒiːnoʊ/ is the hypothetical fermionic supersymmetric field quantum (superpartner) of a gauge field, as predicted by gauge theory combined with supersymmetry. All gauginos have a spin of 1/2, except for the gravitino, which has a spin of 3/2.

In the minimal supersymmetric extension of the Standard Model the following gauginos exist:

- The gluino (symbol g͂) is the superpartner of the gluon, and hence carries color charge.
- The gravitino (symbol G͂) is the supersymmetric partner of the graviton.
- Three winos (symbol W͂^{±} and W͂^{3}) are the superpartners of the W bosons of the SU(2)_{L} gauge fields.
- The bino is the superpartner of the U(1) gauge field corresponding to weak hypercharge.

Sometimes the term "electroweakinos" is used to refer to winos and binos and on occasion also higgsinos. Note that in other SUSY models the zino (Z͂) is the superpartner of the Z boson.

== Mixing ==
Gauginos mix with higgsinos, the superpartners of the Higgs field's degrees of freedom, to form mass eigenstates called neutralinos, which are electrically neutral, and charginos, which are electrically charged.

In many supersymmetric models, the lightest supersymmetric particle (LSP), often a neutralino such as the photino, is stable. In that case it is a weakly interacting massive particle (WIMP) and a candidate for dark matter.

== See also ==
- Gaugino condensation
