= Light dark matter =

Dark matter weakly interacting massive particles candidates with masses less than 1 GeV

Light dark matter, in astronomy and cosmology, are dark matter weakly interacting massive particles (WIMPS) candidates with masses less than 1 GeV (i.e., a mass similar to or less than a neutron or proton). These particles are heavier than warm dark matter and hot dark matter, but are lighter than the traditional forms of cold dark matter, such as Massive Compact Halo Objects (MACHOs). The Lee-Weinberg bound limits the mass of the favored dark matter candidate, WIMPs, that interact via the weak interaction to $\approx 2$ GeV. This bound arises as follows. The lower the mass of WIMPs is, the lower the annihilation cross section, which is of the order $\approx m^2/M^4$, where m is the WIMP mass and M the mass of the Z boson. This means that low mass WIMPs, which would be abundantly produced in the early universe, freeze out (i.e. stop interacting) much earlier and thus at a higher temperature, than higher mass WIMPs. This leads to a higher relic WIMP density. If the mass is lower than $\sim 2$ GeV the WIMP relic density would overclose the universe.

Some of the few loopholes allowing one to avoid the Lee-Weinberg bound without introducing new forces below the electroweak scale have been ruled out by accelerator experiments (i.e. CERN, Tevatron), and in decays of B mesons.

A viable way of building light dark matter models is thus by postulating new light bosons. This increases the annihilation cross section and reduces the coupling of dark matter particles to the Standard Model making them consistent with accelerator experiments.

Current methods to search for light dark matter particles include direct detection through electron recoil.

== Motivation ==
In recent years, light dark matter has become popular due in part to the many benefits of the theory. Sub-GeV dark matter has been used to explain the positron excess in the Galactic Center observed by INTEGRAL, excess gamma rays from the Galactic Center and extragalactic sources. It has also been suggested that light dark matter may explain a small discrepancy in the measured value of the fine structure constant in different experiments. Furthermore, the lack of dark matter signals in higher energy ranges in direct detection experiments incentivizes sub-GeV searches.

== Theoretical models ==
Due to the constraints placed on the mass of WIMPs in the popular freeze out model which predict WIMP masses greater than 2 GeV, the freeze out model must be altered to allow for lower mass dark matter particles.

=== Scalar dark matter ===
The Lee–Weinberg limit, which restricts the mass of dark matter particles to >2 GeV may not apply in two special cases where dark matter is a scalar particle.

The first case requires that the scalar dark matter particle is coupled with a massive fermion. This model rules out dark matter particles less than 100 MeV because observations of gamma ray production do not align with theoretical predictions for particles in this mass range. This discrepancy may be resolved by requiring an asymmetry between the dark matter particles and antiparticles, as well as adding new particles.

The second case predicts that the scalar dark matter particle is coupled with a new gauge boson. The production of gamma rays due to annihilation in this case is predicted to be very low.

=== Freeze in model ===
The thermal freeze in model proposes that dark matter particles were very weakly interacting shortly after the Big Bang such that they were essentially decoupled from the plasma. Furthermore, their initial abundance was small. Dark matter production occurs predominantly when the temperature of the plasma falls under the mass of the dark matter particle itself. This is in contrast to the thermal freeze out theory, in which the initial abundance of dark matter was large, and differentiation into lighter particles decreases and eventually stops as the temperature of the plasma decreases.

The freeze in model allows for dark matter particles well under the 2 GeV mass limit to exist.

=== Asymmetric dark matter ===
Observations show that the density of dark matter is about 5 times the density of baryonic matter. Asymmetric dark matter theories attempt to explain this relationship by suggesting that the ratio between the number densities of particles and antiparticles is the same in baryonic matter as it is in dark matter. This further implies that the mass of dark matter is close to 5 times the mass of baryonic matter, placing the mass of dark matter in the few GeV range.

== Experiments ==
In general, the methods for detecting dark matter which apply to all heavier dark matter candidates also apply to light dark matter. These methods include direct detection and indirect detection. Dark matter particles with masses lighter than 1 GeV can be directly detected by searching for electron recoils. The greatest difficulty in using this method is creating a detector with a low enough threshold energy for detection while also minimizing background signals. Electron beam dump experiments can also be used to search for light dark matter particles.

=== XENON10 ===
XENON10 is a liquid xenon detector that searches for and places limits on the mass of dark matter by directly detecting electron recoil. This experiment placed the first sub GeV limits on the mass of dark matter using direct detection in 2012.

=== SENSEI ===
SENSEI is a silicon detector capable of measuring the electronic recoil of a dark matter particle between 500 keV and 4 MeV using CCD technology. The experiment has been working to place further rule out possible mass ranges of dark matter below 1 GeV, with its most recent results being published in October 2020.

== See also ==
- Axion
- Axion Dark Matter Experiment
- Dark matter halo
- Minimal Supersymmetric Standard Model
- Neutralino
- Scalar field dark matter
- Weakly interacting massive particles
- Weakly interacting slender particles
