= Darkon =

Darkon may refer to:

- The Israeli passport (Hebrew: Darkon Yisre'eli)
- Darkon, a domain of the Ravenloft campaign in the Advanced Dungeons & Dragons role-playing game
- The primary antagonist of Teknoman
- The Darkon Wargaming Club, a live-action role-playing group located in the United States
- Darkon (film), a film based on the above club
- Darkon (unparticle), a hypothetical dark matter field
