= Next-to-Minimal Supersymmetric Standard Model =

Extension to the MSSM solving the mu-problem

In particle physics, NMSSM is an acronym for Next-to-Minimal Supersymmetric Standard Model. It is a supersymmetric extension to the Standard Model that adds an additional singlet chiral superfield to the MSSM and can be used to dynamically generate the $\mu$ term, solving the $\mu$-problem. Articles about the NMSSM are available for review.

The Minimal Supersymmetric Standard Model does not explain why the $\mu$ parameter in the superpotential term $\mu H_u H_d$ is at the electroweak scale. The idea behind the Next-to-Minimal Supersymmetric Standard Model is to promote the $\mu$ term to a gauge singlet, chiral superfield $S$. Note that the scalar superpartner of the singlino $S$ is denoted by $\hat{S}$ and the spin-1/2 singlino superpartner by $\tilde{S}$ in the following. The superpotential for the NMSSM is given by

$$W_{\text{NMSSM}}=W_{\text{Yuk}}+\lambda S H_u H_d + \frac{\kappa}{3} S^3$$

where $W_{\text{Yuk}}$ gives the Yukawa couplings for the Standard Model fermions. Since the superpotential has a mass dimension of 3, the couplings $\lambda$ and $\kappa$ are dimensionless; hence the $\mu$-problem of the MSSM is solved in the NMSSM, the superpotential of the NMSSM being scale-invariant. The role of the $\lambda$ term is to generate an effective $\mu$ term. This is done with the scalar component of the singlet $\hat{S}$ getting a vacuum-expectation value of $\langle \hat{S} \rangle$; that is, we have

$$\mu_{\text{eff}}= \lambda \langle \hat{S} \rangle$$

Without the $\kappa$ term the superpotential would have a U(1)' symmetry, so-called Peccei–Quinn symmetry; see Peccei–Quinn theory. This additional symmetry would alter the phenomenology completely. The role of the $\kappa$ term is to break this U(1)' symmetry. The $\kappa$ term is introduced trilinearly such that $\kappa$ is dimensionless. However, there remains a discrete $\mathbb{Z}_3$ symmetry, which is moreover broken spontaneously. In principle this leads to the domain wall problem. Introducing additional but suppressed terms, the $\mathbb{Z}_3$ symmetry can be broken without changing phenomenology at the electroweak scale. It is assumed that the domain wall problem is circumvented in this way without any modifications except far beyond the electroweak scale.

Other models have been proposed which solve the $\mu$-problem of the MSSM. One idea is to keep the $\kappa$ term in the superpotential and take the U(1)' symmetry into account. Assuming this symmetry to be local, an additional, $Z'$ gauge boson is predicted in this model, called the UMSSM.

== Phenomenology ==
Due to the additional singlet $S$, the NMSSM alters in general the phenomenology of both the Higgs sector and the neutralino sector compared with the MSSM.

=== Higgs phenomenology ===
In the Standard Model we have one physical Higgs boson. In the MSSM we encounter five physical Higgs bosons. Due to the additional singlet $\hat{S}$ in the NMSSM we have two more Higgs bosons; that is, in total seven physical Higgs bosons. Its Higgs sector is therefore much richer than that of the MSSM. In particular, the Higgs potential is in general no longer invariant under CP transformations; see CP violation. Typically, the Higgs bosons in the NMSSM are denoted in an order with increasing masses; that is, by $H_1, H_2, ..., H_7$, with $H_1$ the lightest Higgs boson. In the special case of a CP-conserving Higgs potential we have three CP even Higgs bosons, $H_1, H_2, H_3$, two CP odd ones, $A_1, A_2$, and a pair of charged Higgs bosons, $H^+, H^-$. In the MSSM, the lightest Higgs boson is always Standard Model-like, and therefore its production and decays are roughly known. In the NMSSM, the lightest Higgs can be very light (even of the order of 1 GeV), and thus may have escaped detection so far. In addition, in the CP-conserving case, the lightest CP even Higgs boson turns out to have an enhanced lower bound compared with the MSSM. This is one of the reasons why the NMSSM has been the focus of much attention in recent years.

=== Neutralino phenomenology ===
The spin-1/2 singlino $\tilde{S}$ gives a fifth neutralino, compared with the four neutralinos of the MSSM. The singlino does not couple with any gauge bosons, gauginos (the superpartners of the gauge bosons), leptons, sleptons (the superpartners of the leptons), quarks or squarks (the superpartners of the quarks). Suppose that a supersymmetric partner particle is produced at a collider, for instance at the LHC, the singlino is omitted in cascade decays and therefore escapes detection. However, if the singlino is the lightest supersymmetric particle (LSP), all supersymmetric partner particles eventually decay into the singlino. Due to R parity conservation this LSP is stable. In this way the singlino could be detected via missing transverse energy in a detector.
