= WISP (particle physics) =

In particle physics, the acronym WISP refers to a largely hypothetical weakly interacting sub-eV particle, or weakly interacting slender particle, or weakly interacting slim particle – low-mass particles which rarely interact with conventional particles.

The term is used to generally categorize a type of dark matter candidate, and is essentially synonymous with axion-like particle (ALP). WISPs are generally hypothetical particles.

WISPs are the low-mass counterpart of weakly interacting massive particles (WIMPs).

== Discussion ==
Except for conventional, active neutrinos, all WISPs are candidate dark matter constituents, and many proposed experiments to detect WISPs might possibly be able to detect several different kinds. "WISP" is most often used to refer to a low-mass hypothetical particles which are viable dark matter candidates. Examples include:

- Axion – long-standing hypothetical strong force related light particle
- Sterile neutrino – never-observed particles explicitly excluded (if they exist) from the weak, strong, and electromagnetic interactions
- Supersymmetric particles, particularly the lightest supersymmetric particle which might be a
  - Neutralino – supersymmetric fermions that are electrically neutral composites of superpartners to bosons

== Excluded active neutrinos ==
Although ordinary "active" neutrinos (left-chiral neutrinos and right-chiral antineutrinos) are particles known to exist, and though active neutrinos do indeed technically satisfy the description of the term, they are often excluded from lists of "WISP" particles.

The reason that active neutrinos are often not included among WISPs is that they are no longer viable dark matter candidates: current estimated limits on their number density and mass indicate that their cumulative mass-density could not be high enough to account for the amount of dark matter inferred from its observed effects, although they certainly do make some small contribution to dark matter density.

== Sources ==
The various sources of WISPs could possibly include hot astrophysical plasma and energy transport in stars. Note however, that since they remain hypothetical (except for active neutrinos), the means of creation of WISPs depends on the theoretical framework used to propose them.

== See also ==
- Axion
- Feebly interacting particle (FIP)
- Hot dark matter
- Light dark matter
- Lightest supersymmetric particle (LSP)
- Sterile neutrino
- Weakly interacting massive particle (WIMP)
