= Feebly interacting particle =

Feebly interacting particles (FIPs) are subatomic particles defined by having extremely suppressed interactions with the Standard Model (SM) bosons and / or fermions. These particles are potential thermal dark matter candidates, extending the model of weakly interacting massive particles (WIMPs) to include weakly interacting sub-eV particles (WISPs) and others. FIP physics is also known as dark-sector physics.

== Candidates ==
FIP candidates could be massive (FIMP / WIMP) or massless and coupled to the SM particles through some minimal coupling strength. The light FIPs are theorized to be dark matter candidates, and, they provide an explanation for the origin of neutrino masses and CP symmetry in strong interactions.

Neutrinos technically qualify as FIPs, but usually when the acronym "FIP" is used, it is intended to refer to some other, as-yet unknown particle. Cai, Cacciapaglia, and Lee (2022) proposed massive gravitons as feebly interacting particle candidates.

== See also ==
- WIMP – weakly interacting massive particle
- WISP – weakly interacting sub-eV / slight / slender particle
