= Lightest supersymmetric particle =

Lightest new particle in a supersymmetric model

In particle physics, the lightest supersymmetric particle (LSP) is the generic name given to the lightest of the additional hypothetical particles found in supersymmetric models. In models with R-parity conservation, the LSP is stable; in other words, it cannot decay into any Standard Model particle, since all SM particles have the opposite R-parity. There is extensive observational evidence for an additional component of the matter density in the universe, which goes under the name dark matter. The LSP of supersymmetric models is a dark matter candidate and is a weakly interacting massive particle (WIMP).

== Constraints on LSP from cosmology ==
The LSP is unlikely to be a charged wino, charged higgsino, slepton, sneutrino, gluino, squark, or gravitino but is most likely a mixture of neutral higgsinos, the bino and the neutral winos, i.e. a neutralino. In particular, if the LSP were charged (and is abundant in our galaxy) such particles would have been captured by the Earth's magnetic field and form heavy hydrogen-like atoms. Searches for anomalous hydrogen in natural water however have been without any evidence for such particles and thus put severe constraints on the existence of a charged LSP.

== As a dark matter candidate ==
Dark matter particles must be electrically neutral; otherwise they would scatter light and thus not be "dark". They must also almost certainly be non-colored. With these constraints, the LSP could be the lightest neutralino, the gravitino, or the lightest sneutrino.

- Sneutrino dark matter is ruled out in the Minimal Supersymmetric Standard Model (MSSM) because of the current limits on the interaction cross section of dark matter particles with ordinary matter as measured by direct detection experiments—the sneutrino interacts via Z boson exchange and would have been detected by now if it makes up the dark matter. Extended models with right-handed or sterile sneutrinos reopen the possibility of sneutrino dark matter by lowering the interaction cross section.
- Neutralino dark matter is the favored possibility. In most models the lightest neutralino is mostly bino (superpartner of the hypercharge gauge boson field B), with some admixture of neutral wino (superpartner of the weak isospin gauge boson field W^{0}) and/or neutral Higgsino.
- Gravitino dark matter is a possibility in supersymmetric models in which the scale of supersymmetry breaking is low, around 100 TeV. In such models the gravitino is very light, of order an eV. As dark matter, the gravitino is sometimes called a super-WIMP because its interaction strength is much weaker than that of other supersymmetric dark matter candidates. For the same reason, its direct thermal production in the early universe is too inefficient to account for the observed dark matter abundance. Rather, gravitinos would have to be produced through the decay of the next-to-lightest supersymmetric particle (NLSP).

In extra-dimensional theories, there are analogous particles called LKPs or Lightest Kaluza–Klein Particle. These are the stable particles of extra-dimensional theories.

== See also ==
- Darkon (unparticle)
- List of hypothetical particles
- Supersymmetry
- Weakly interacting slender particle
