= Soft SUSY breaking =

Hypothetical physical process

In theoretical physics, soft SUSY breaking is type of supersymmetry breaking that does not cause ultraviolet divergences to appear in scalar masses.

== Overview ==
These terms are relevant operators—i.e. operators whose coefficients have a positive dimension of mass—though there are some exceptions.

A model with soft SUSY breaking was proposed in 1981 by Howard Georgi and Savas Dimopoulos. Before this, dynamical models of supersymmetry breaking were being used that suffered from giving rise to color and charge breaking vacua.

Soft SUSY breaking decouples the origin of supersymmetry breaking from its phenomenological consequences. In effect, soft SUSY breaking adds explicit symmetry breaking to the supersymmetric Standard Model Lagrangian. The source of SUSY breaking results from a different sector where supersymmetry is broken spontaneously. Divorcing the spontaneous supersymmetry breaking from the supersymmetric Standard Model leads to the notion of mediated supersymmetry breaking.

== Example operators ==
- Gaugino mass
- Scalar masses
- Scalar trilinear interactions ("A-terms")

== Nonholomorphic soft supersymmetry breaking interactions ==
In low energy supersymmetry based models, the soft supersymmetry breaking interactions excepting the mass terms are usually considered to be holomorphic functions of fields. While a superpotential such as that of MSSM needs to be holomorphic, there is no reason why soft supersymmetry breaking interactions are required to be holomorphic functions of fields. Of course, an arbitrary nonholomorphic interaction may invite an appearance of quadratic divergence (or hard supersymmetry breaking); however, there are scenarios with no gauge singlet fields where nonholomorphic interactions can as well be of soft supersymmetry breaking type. One may consider a hidden sector based supersymmetry breaking, with $X$ and $\Phi$ to be chiral superfields. Then, there exist nonholomorphic $D$-term contributions of the forms $\frac{1}{M^3} [XX^*\Phi^2\Phi^*]_D$ and $\frac{1}{M^3} [XX^*D^\alpha\Phi D_\alpha\Phi]_D$ that are soft supersymmetry breaking in nature. The above lead to nonholomorphic trilinear soft terms like $\phi^2\phi^*$ and an explicit Higgsino soft mass term like $\psi \psi$ in the Lagrangian. The coefficients of both $\phi^2\phi^*$ and $\psi \psi$ terms are proportional to $\frac{|F|^2}{M^3}$, where $|F|$ is the vacuum expectation value of the auxiliary field components of $X$ and $M$ is the scale of mediation of supersymmetry breaking. Away from MSSM, there can be higgsino-gaugino interactions like $\psi \lambda$ that are also nonholomorphic in nature.
