= Free parameter =

Variable in a mathematical model

A free parameter is a variable in a mathematical model which cannot be predicted precisely or constrained by the model and must be estimated experimentally or theoretically. A mathematical model, theory, or conjecture is more likely to be right and less likely to be the product of wishful thinking if it relies on few free parameters and is consistent with large amounts of data.

== See also ==
- Decision variables
- Exogenous variables
- Naturalness (physics)
- Overfitting
- Random variables
- State variables
