= Neutrino minimal standard model =

The neutrino minimal standard model (often abbreviated as νMSM) is an extension of the Standard Model of particle physics, by the addition of three right-handed neutrinos with masses smaller than the electroweak scale. Introduced by Takehiko Asaka and Mikhail Shaposhnikov in 2005, it has provided a highly constrained model for many topics in physics and cosmology, such as baryogenesis and neutrino oscillations.
