= Supersymmetry breaking =

Problem in supersymmetric theory

In particle physics, supersymmetry breaking or SUSY breaking is a process via which a seemingly non-supersymmetric physics emerges from a supersymmetric theory. Assuming a breaking of supersymmetry is a necessary step to reconcile supersymmetry with experimental observations.

Superpartner particles, whose mass is equal to the mass of the regular particles in supersymmetry, become much heavier with supersymmetry breaking. In supergravity, this results in a slightly modified counterpart of the Higgs mechanism where the gravitinos become massive.

Supersymmetry breaking is relevant in the domain of applicability of stochastic differential equations, which includes classical physics, and encompasses nonlinear dynamical phenomena as chaos, turbulence, and pink noise. Various mechanisms for this breaking have been discussed by physicists, including soft SUSY breaking and types of spontaneous symmetry breaking.

== Supersymmetry breaking scale ==
The energy scale where supersymmetry breaking takes place is known as the supersymmetry breaking scale. In the scenario known as low energy supersymmetry, in which supersymmetry fully solves the hierarchy problem, this scale should not be far from 1000 GeV, and therefore should be accessible using the Large Hadron Collider and future accelerators.

However, supersymmetry may also be broken at high energy scales. Nature does not have to be supersymmetric at any scale.

== See also ==
- Supersymmetric theory of stochastic dynamics
- Big Bang
