= Unparticle physics =

Speculative theory of non-particle matter

In theoretical physics, unparticle physics is a speculative theory that conjectures a form of matter that cannot be explained in terms of particles using the Standard Model of particle physics, because its components are scale invariant.

Howard Georgi proposed this theory in two 2007 papers, "Unparticle Physics" and "Another Odd Thing About Unparticle Physics". His papers were followed by further work by other researchers into the properties and phenomenology of unparticle physics and its potential impact on particle physics, astrophysics, cosmology, CP violation, lepton flavour violation, muon decay, neutrino oscillations, and supersymmetry.

== Background ==
All particles exist in states that may be characterized by a certain energy, momentum and mass. In most of the Standard Model of particle physics, particles of the same type cannot exist in another state with all these properties scaled up or down by a common factor –electrons, for example, always have the same mass regardless of their energy or momentum. But this is not always the case: massless particles, such as photons, can exist with their properties scaled equally. This immunity to scaling is called "scale invariance".

The idea of unparticles comes from conjecturing that there may be "stuff" that does not necessarily have zero mass but is still scale-invariant, with the same physics regardless of a change of length (or equivalently energy). This stuff is unlike particles, and described as unparticle. The unparticle stuff is equivalent to particles with a continuous spectrum of mass.

Such unparticle stuff has not been observed, which suggests that if it exists, it must couple with normal matter weakly at observable energies. Since the Large Hadron Collider (LHC) team announced it will begin probing a higher energy frontier in 2009, some theoretical physicists have begun to consider the properties of unparticle stuff and how it may appear in LHC experiments. One of the great hopes for the LHC is that it might come up with some discoveries that will help us update or replace our best description of the particles that make up matter and the forces that glue them together.

== Properties ==
Unparticles would have properties in common with neutrinos, which have almost zero mass and are therefore nearly scale invariant. Neutrinos barely interact with matter – most of the time physicists can infer their presence only by calculating the "missing" energy and momentum after an interaction. By looking at the same interaction many times, a probability distribution is built up that tells more specifically how many and what sort of neutrinos are involved. They couple very weakly to ordinary matter at low energies, and the effect of the coupling increases as the energy increases.

A similar technique could be used to search for evidence of unparticles. According to scale invariance, a distribution containing unparticles would become apparent because it would resemble a distribution for a fractional number of massless particles.

This scale invariant sector would interact very weakly with the rest of the Standard Model, making it possible to observe evidence for unparticle stuff, if it exists. The unparticle theory is a high-energy theory that contains both Standard Model fields and Banks–Zaks fields, which have scale-invariant behavior at an infrared point. The two fields can interact through the interactions of ordinary particles if the energy of the interaction is sufficiently high.

These particle interactions would appear to have "missing" energy and momentum that would not be detected by the experimental apparatus. Certain distinct distributions of missing energy would signify the production of unparticle stuff. If such signatures are not observed, bounds on the model can be set and refined.

== Experimental indications ==
Unparticle physics has been proposed as an explanation for anomalies in superconducting cuprate materials, where the charge measured by ARPES appears to exceed predictions from Luttinger's theorem for the quantity of electrons.
