= Weakly interacting massive particle =

Hypothetical particles that may constitute dark matter

Weakly interacting massive particles (WIMPs) are hypothetical particles that are one of the proposed candidates for dark matter. These particles would have mass and would interact with gravity, would have been created in abundance during the Big Bang, and would since have reduced in number because of self-annihilation caused by their weak interaction.

There exists no formal definition of a WIMP, but broadly, it is an elementary particle that interacts via gravity and any other force (or forces) that is as weak as or weaker than the weak nuclear force, but also non-vanishing in strength. Many WIMP candidates are expected to have been produced thermally in the early Universe, similarly to the particles of the Standard Model according to Big Bang cosmology, and usually will constitute cold dark matter. Obtaining the correct abundance of dark matter today via thermal production requires a self-annihilation cross section of $\langle \sigma v \rangle$ ≃ 3×10^{−26} cm^{3}⋅s^{−1}, which is roughly what is expected for a new particle in the 100 GeV/c^{2} mass range that interacts via the electroweak force.

Experimental efforts to detect WIMPs include the search for products of WIMP annihilation, including gamma rays, neutrinos and cosmic rays in nearby galaxies and galaxy clusters; direct detection experiments designed to measure the collision of WIMPs with nuclei in the laboratory, as well as attempts to directly produce WIMPs in colliders, such as the Large Hadron Collider at CERN. As of 2026, none of these efforts have shown success.

Supersymmetric extensions of the Standard Model of particle physics readily predict new particles that could serve as WIMPs. This apparent coincidence is known as the "WIMP miracle", and a stable supersymmetric partner has long been a prime WIMP candidate. These candidate WIMPs include neutralinos and gravitinos. The lack of evidence for supersymmetry at the Large Hadron Collider (LHC) experiment have cast doubt on these simplest WIMP hypotheses, however.

Proposed dark matter particles and their masses.

== Theoretical framework and properties ==
WIMP-like particles are predicted by R-parity-conserving supersymmetry, a type of extension to the Standard Model of particle physics, although none of the large number of new particles in supersymmetry have been observed. WIMP-like particles are also predicted by universal extra dimension and little Higgs theories.

Model	parity	candidate
SUSY	R-parity	lightest supersymmetric particle (LSP)
UED	KK-parity	lightest Kaluza–Klein particle (LKP)
little Higgs	T-parity	lightest T-odd particle (LTP)

The main theoretical characteristics of a WIMP are:

- Interactions only through the weak nuclear force and gravity, or possibly other interactions with cross-sections no higher than the weak scale;
- Large mass compared to standard particles (WIMPs with sub-GeV/c^{2} masses may be considered to be light dark matter).

Because of their lack of electromagnetic interaction with normal matter, WIMPs would be invisible through normal electromagnetic observations. Because of their large mass, they would be relatively slow moving and therefore "cold". Their relatively low velocities would be insufficient to overcome the mutual gravitational attraction, and as a result, WIMPs would tend to clump together. WIMPs are considered one of the main candidates for cold dark matter, the others being massive compact halo objects (MACHOs) and axions. These names were deliberately chosen for contrast, with MACHOs named later than WIMPs. In contrast to WIMPs, there are no known stable particles within the Standard Model of particle physics that have the properties of MACHOs. The particles that have little interaction with normal matter, such as neutrinos, are very light, and hence would be fast moving, or "hot".

== As dark matter ==
A decade after the dark matter problem was established in the 1970s, WIMPs were suggested as a potential solution to the issue. Although the existence of WIMPs in nature is still hypothetical, it would resolve a number of astrophysical and cosmological problems related to dark matter. There is consensus today among astronomers that most of the mass in the Universe is indeed dark. Simulations of a universe full of cold dark matter produce galaxy distributions that are roughly similar to what is observed. By contrast, hot dark matter would smear out the large-scale structure of galaxies and thus is not considered a viable cosmological model.

WIMPs fit the model of a relic dark matter particle from the early Universe, when all particles were in a state of thermal equilibrium. For sufficiently high temperatures, such as those existing in the early Universe, the dark matter particle and its antiparticle would have been both forming from and annihilating into lighter particles. As the Universe expanded and cooled, the average thermal energy of these lighter particles decreased and eventually became insufficient to form a dark matter particle-antiparticle pair. The annihilation of the dark matter particle-antiparticle pairs, however, would have continued, and the number density of dark matter particles would have begun to decrease exponentially. Eventually, however, the number density would become so low that the dark matter particle and antiparticle interaction would cease, and the number of dark matter particles would remain (roughly) constant as the Universe continued to expand. Particles with a larger interaction cross section would continue to annihilate for a longer period of time, and thus would have a smaller number density when the annihilation interaction ceases. Based on the current estimated abundance of dark matter in the Universe, if the dark matter particle is such a relic particle, the interaction cross section governing the particle-antiparticle annihilation can be no larger than the cross section for the weak interaction. If this model is correct, the dark matter particle would have the properties of the WIMP.

== Indirect detection ==
Because WIMPs may only interact through gravitational and weak forces, they would be extremely difficult to detect. Nonetheless, there are many experiments underway to attempt to detect WIMPs both directly and indirectly. Indirect detection refers to the observation of annihilation or decay products of WIMPs far away from Earth. Indirect detection efforts typically focus on locations where WIMP dark matter is thought to accumulate the most: in the centers of galaxies and galaxy clusters, as well as in the smaller satellite galaxies of the Milky Way. These are particularly useful since they tend to contain very little baryonic matter, reducing the expected background from standard astrophysical processes. Typical indirect searches look for excess gamma rays, which are predicted both as final-state products of annihilation, or are produced as charged particles interact with ambient radiation via inverse Compton scattering. The spectrum and intensity of a gamma ray signal depends on the annihilation products, and must be computed on a model-by-model basis. Experiments that have placed bounds on WIMP annihilation, via the non-observation of an annihilation signal, include the Fermi-LAT gamma ray telescope and the VERITAS ground-based gamma ray observatory. The Galactic Center GeV excess and a similar 21-GeV excess in the Galactic halo have been proposed to be caused by WIMP annihilation. Although the annihilation of WIMPs into Standard Model particles also predicts the production of high-energy neutrinos, their interaction rate is thought to be too low to reliably detect a dark matter signal at present. Future observations from the IceCube observatory in Antarctica may be able to differentiate WIMP-produced neutrinos from standard astrophysical neutrinos; by 2014, only 37 cosmological neutrinos had been observed, making such a distinction impossible.

Another type of indirect WIMP signal could come from the Sun. Halo WIMPs may, as they pass through the Sun, interact with solar protons, helium nuclei as well as heavier elements. If a WIMP loses enough energy in such an interaction to fall below the local escape velocity, it would theoretically not have enough energy to escape the gravitational pull of the Sun and would remain gravitationally bound. As more and more WIMPs thermalize inside the Sun, they would begin to annihilate with each other, theoretically forming a variety of particles, including high-energy neutrinos. These neutrinos may then travel to the Earth to be detected in one of the many neutrino telescopes, such as the Super-Kamiokande detector in Japan. The number of neutrino events detected per day at these detectors depends on the properties of the WIMP, as well as on the mass of the Higgs boson. Similar experiments are underway to attempt to detect neutrinos from WIMP annihilations within the Earth and from within the galactic center.

== Direct detection ==
Direct detection refers to the observation of the effects of a WIMP-nucleus collision as the dark matter passes through a detector in an Earth laboratory. While most WIMP models indicate that a large enough number of WIMPs must be captured in large celestial bodies for indirect detection experiments to succeed, it remains possible that these models are either incorrect or only explain part of the dark matter phenomenon. Thus, even with the multiple experiments dedicated to providing indirect evidence for the existence of cold dark matter, direct detection measurements are also necessary to solidify the theory of WIMPs.

Although most WIMPs encountering the Sun or the Earth are expected to pass through without any effect, it is hoped that a large number of dark matter WIMPs crossing a sufficiently large detector will interact often enough to be seen—at least a few events per year. The general strategy of current attempts to detect WIMPs is to find very sensitive systems that can be scaled to large volumes. This follows the lessons learned from the history of the discovery, and (by now routine) detection, of the neutrino.

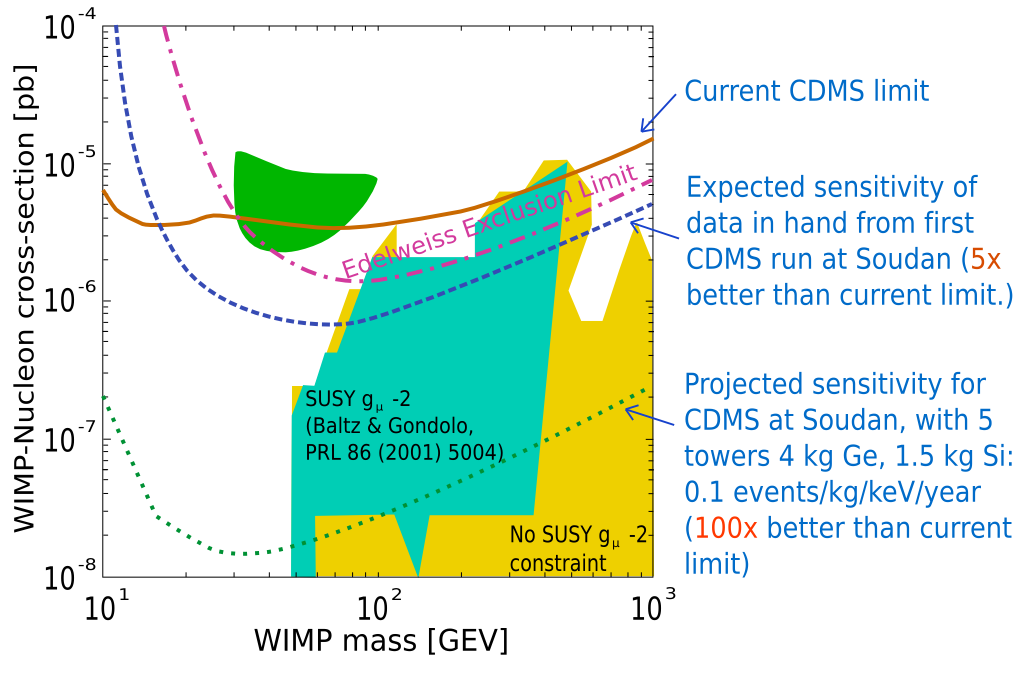
Fig 1. CDMS parameter space excluded as of 2004. DAMA result is located in green area and is disallowed.

=== Experimental techniques ===
Cryogenic crystal detectors – A technique used by the Cryogenic Dark Matter Search (CDMS) detector at the Soudan Mine relies on multiple very cold germanium and silicon crystals. The crystals (each about the size of a hockey puck) are cooled to about 50 mK. A layer of metal (aluminium and tungsten) at the surfaces is used to detect a WIMP passing through the crystal. This design hopes to detect vibrations in the crystal matrix generated by an atom being "kicked" by a WIMP. The tungsten transition-edge sensors (TES) are held at the critical temperature so they are in the superconducting state. Large crystal vibrations will generate heat in the metal and are detectable because of a change in resistance. CRESST, CoGeNT, and EDELWEISS run similar setups.

Noble gas scintillators – Another way of detecting atoms "knocked about" by a WIMP is to use scintillating material, so that light pulses are generated by the moving atom and detected, often with PMTs. Experiments such as DEAP at SNOLAB and DarkSide at the LNGS instrument a very large target mass of liquid argon for sensitive WIMP searches. ZEPLIN, and XENON used xenon to exclude WIMPs at higher sensitivity, with the most stringent limits to date provided by the XENON1T detector, utilizing 3.5 tons of liquid xenon. Even larger multi-ton liquid xenon detectors have been approved for construction from the XENON, LUX-ZEPLIN and PandaX collaborations.

Crystal scintillators – Instead of a liquid noble gas, an in principle simpler approach is the use of a scintillating crystal such as NaI(Tl). This approach is taken by DAMA/LIBRA, an experiment that observed an annular modulation of the signal consistent with WIMP detection (see § Recent limits). Several experiments are attempting to replicate those results, including ANAIS, COSINUS and DM-Ice, which is codeploying NaI crystals with the IceCube detector at the South Pole. KIMS is approaching the same problem using CsI(Tl) as a scintillator.

Bubble chambers – The PICASSO (Project In Canada to Search for Supersymmetric Objects) experiment is a direct dark matter search experiment that is located at SNOLAB in Canada. It uses bubble detectors with Freon as the active mass. PICASSO is predominantly sensitive to spin-dependent interactions of WIMPs with the fluorine atoms in the Freon. COUPP, a similar experiment using trifluoroiodomethane(CF_{3}I), published limits for mass above 20 GeV/c^{2} in 2011. The two experiments merged into PICO collaboration in 2012.

A bubble detector is a radiation sensitive device that uses small droplets of superheated liquid that are suspended in a gel matrix. It uses the principle of a bubble chamber but, since only the small droplets can undergo a phase transition at a time, the detector can stay active for much longer periods. When enough energy is deposited in a droplet by ionizing radiation, the superheated droplet becomes a gas bubble. The bubble development is accompanied by an acoustic shock wave that is picked up by piezo-electric sensors. The main advantage of the bubble detector technique is that the detector is almost insensitive to background radiation. The detector sensitivity can be adjusted by changing the temperature, typically operated between 15 °C and 55 °C. There is another similar experiment using this technique in Europe called SIMPLE.

PICASSO reports results (November 2009) for spin-dependent WIMP interactions on ^{19}F, for masses of 24 Gev new stringent limits have been obtained on the spin-dependent cross section of 13.9 pb (90% CL). The obtained limits restrict recent interpretations of the DAMA/LIBRA annual modulation effect in terms of spin dependent interactions.

PICO is an expansion of the concept planned in 2015.

Other types of detectors – Time projection chambers (TPCs) filled with low pressure gases are being studied for WIMP detection. The Directional Recoil Identification From Tracks (DRIFT) collaboration is attempting to utilize the predicted directionality of the WIMP signal. DRIFT uses a carbon disulfide target, that allows WIMP recoils to travel several millimetres, leaving a track of charged particles. This charged track is drifted to an MWPC readout plane that allows it to be reconstructed in three dimensions and determine the origin direction. DMTPC is a similar experiment with CF_{4} gas.

The DAMIC (DArk Matter In CCDs) and SENSEI (Sub Electron Noise Skipper CCD Experimental Instrument) collaborations employ the use of scientific Charge Coupled Devices (CCDs) to detect light Dark Matter. The CCDs act as both the detector target and the readout instrumentation. WIMP interactions with the bulk of the CCD can induce the creation of electron-hole pairs, which are then collected and readout by the CCDs. In order to decrease the noise and achieve detection of single electrons, the experiments make use of a type of CCD known as the Skipper CCD, which allows for averaging over repeated measurements of the same collected charge.

=== Recent limits ===
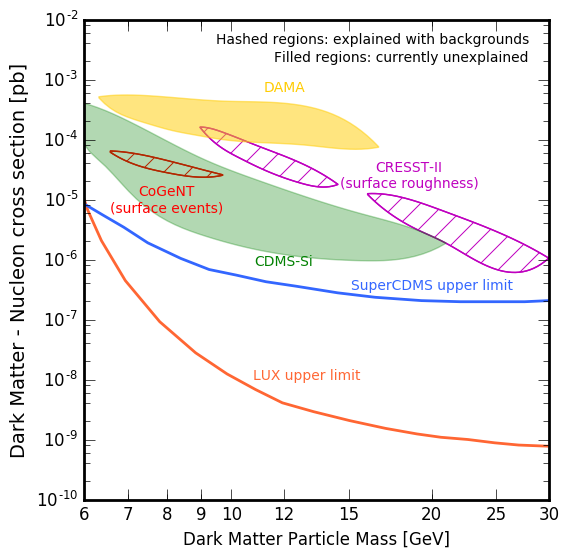
Figure 2: Plot showing the parameter space of dark matter particle mass and interaction cross section with nucleons. The LUX and SuperCDMS limits exclude the parameter space above the labelled curves. The CoGeNT and CRESST-II regions indicate regions that were previously thought to correspond to dark matter signals, but that were later explained with mundane sources. The DAMA and CDMS-Si data remain unexplained, and these regions indicate the preferred parameter space if these anomalies are due to dark matter.

There are currently no confirmed detections of dark matter from direct detection experiments, with the strongest exclusion limits coming from the LUX and SuperCDMS experiments, as shown in figure 2. With 370 kilograms of xenon, LUX is more sensitive than XENON or CDMS. The first results from October 2013 report that no signals were seen, appearing to refute results obtained from less sensitive instruments. This was confirmed after the final data run ended in May 2016.

Historically, there have been four anomalous sets of data from different direct detection experiments, two of which have now been explained with backgrounds (CoGeNT and CRESST-II), and two that remain unexplained (DAMA/LIBRA and CDMS-Si). In February 2010, researchers at CDMS announced that they had observed two events that may have been caused by WIMP-nucleus collisions.

CoGeNT, a smaller detector using a single germanium puck, designed to sense WIMPs with smaller masses, reported hundreds of detection events in 56 days. They observed an annual modulation in the event rate that could indicate light dark matter. A dark matter origin for the CoGeNT events has been refuted by more recent analyses, in favour of an explanation in terms of a background from surface events.

Annual modulation is one of the predicted signatures of a WIMP signal, and on this basis the DAMA collaboration has claimed a positive detection. Other groups, however, have not confirmed this result. The CDMS data, made public in May 2004. exclude the entire DAMA signal region given certain standard assumptions about the properties of the WIMPs and the dark matter halo, and this has been followed by many other experiments (see Figure 2).

The COSINE-100 collaboration (a merging of KIMS and DM-Ice groups) published their results on replicating the DAMA/LIBRA signal in December 2018 in journal Nature; their conclusion was that "this result rules out WIMP–nucleon interactions as the cause of the annual modulation observed by the DAMA collaboration". In 2021, new results from COSINE-100 and ANAIS-112 both failed to replicate the DAMA/LIBRA signal and in August 2022, COSINE-100 applied an analysis method similar to one used by DAMA/LIBRA and found a similar annual modulation suggesting the signal could be just a statistical artifact, supporting a hypothesis first put forward in 2020.

=== Future of direct detection ===
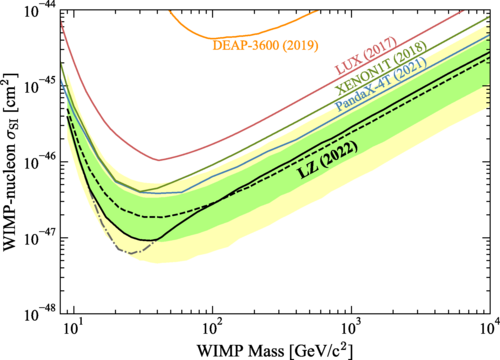
Upper limits for WIMP-nucleon elastic cross sections from selected experiments as reported by the LZ experiment in July 2023.

The 2020s should see the emergence of several multi-tonne mass direct detection experiments, which will probe WIMP-nucleus cross sections orders of magnitude smaller than the current state-of-the-art sensitivity. Examples of such next-generation experiments are LUX-ZEPLIN (LZ) and XENONnT, which are multi-tonne liquid xenon experiments, followed by DARWIN, another proposed liquid xenon direct detection experiment of 50–100 tonnes.

Such multi-tonne experiments will also face a new background in the form of neutrinos, which will limit their ability to probe the WIMP parameter space beyond a certain point, known as the neutrino floor. Although its name may imply a hard limit, the neutrino floor represents the region of parameter space beyond which experimental sensitivity can only improve at best as the square root of exposure (the product of detector mass and running time). For WIMP masses below 10 GeV/c^{2}, the dominant source of neutrino background is from the Sun, while for higher masses the background contains contributions from atmospheric neutrinos and the diffuse supernova neutrino background.

In December 2021, results from PandaX have found no signal in their data, with a lowest excluded cross section of 3.8×10^{−47} cm^{2} at 40 GeV with 90% confidence level.

In July 2023, the XENONnT and LZ experiment published the first results of their searches for WIMPs, the first excluding cross sections above 2.58×10^{−47} cm^{2} at 28 GeV with 90% confidence level and the second excluding cross sections above 9.2×10^{−48} cm^{2} at 36 GeV with 90% confidence level. Further results from XENONnT published in July 2026 exclude cross sections above 6.0×10^{−45} cm^{2} at 5 GeV.

Researchers working with the LUX-ZEPLIN experiment at the Sanford Underground Research Facility in Lead, South Dakota, announced on September 1st, 2026 a single event of possible collision of a xenon nuclei with a dark matter particle with a mass of at least 200 gigaelectronvolts (GeV), and probably around 1,000 GeV.

== See also ==
- Darkon (unparticle) – Hypothetical unparticle
- Feebly interacting particle (FIP)
- Higgs boson – Elementary particle involved with rest mass
- Massive compact halo object (MACHO) – Hypothetical form of dark matter in galactic halos
- Micro black hole – Hypothetical black holes of very small size
- Robust associations of massive baryonic objects (RAMBOs) – Proposed type of star cluster
- Weakly interacting sub-eV / slender / slight particle (WISP)

Theoretical candidates

- Higgsino – Supersymmetric partner of the Higgs boson
- Lightest supersymmetric particle (LSP) – Lightest new particle in a supersymmetric model
- Majorana fermion – Fermion that is its own antiparticle
- Neutralino – Neutral mass eigenstate formed from superpartners of gauge and Higgs bosons
- Planck-mass-sized black hole remnant – Hypothetical black holes of very small size
- Sterile neutrino – Hypothetical particle that interacts only via gravity
