= Naturalness (physics) =

Concept in theoretical physics

Naturalness is understood in theoretical physics and the theory of science to mean a particular, aesthetically motivated construction principle for physical theories, specifically that a theoretical explanation of a phenomenon that does not require an unlikely fine-tuning of parameters that are sparated by multiple orders of magnitude. In other words, naturalness requires that the dimensionless ratios of these parameters do not differ too much from unity and that no poorly justified fine-tuning of the model is required to make it fit observed reality.

More specifically, it can refer to the idea that all of a physical theory's free parameters are close to unity close to the cutoff point of its effectiveness, and that that particular effective physical theory reflects the behaviour of the universe in a specific scale range.

The hierarchy problem of theoretical physics and the question of the fine-tuning of the natural constants are closely related to the concept of naturalness.

The Standard Model of elementary particle physics, which is able to explain the experimental findings with great accuracy, has a naturalness problem, since certain of its parameters must be fine-tuned.

== See also ==
- Barbieri-Ellis-Giudice measure
