= Chargino =

Hypothetical particle in particle physics

In particle physics, the chargino is a hypothetical particle which refers to the mass eigenstates of a charged superpartner, i.e. any new electrically charged fermion (with spin 1/2) predicted by supersymmetry. They are linear combinations of the charged wino and charged higgsinos. There are two charginos that are fermions and are electrically charged, which are typically labeled C͂^{±}_{1} (the lightest) and C͂^{±}_{2} (the heaviest), although sometimes $\tilde{\chi}_1^\pm$ and $\tilde{\chi}_2^\pm$ are also used to refer to charginos, when $\tilde{\chi}_i^0$ is used to refer to neutralinos. The heavier chargino can decay through the neutral Z boson to the lighter chargino. Both can decay through a charged W boson to a neutralino:

C͂^{±}_{2} → C͂^{±}_{1} + Z^{0}
C͂^{±}_{2} → N͂^{0}_{2} + W^{±}
C͂^{±}_{1} → N͂^{0}_{1} + W^{±}

== See also ==
- List of hypothetical particles
- Weakly interacting slender particle
