= Neutralino =

Neutral mass eigenstate formed from superpartners of gauge and Higgs bosons

- Status: Hypothetical
- Symbol: N͂^{0}_{1}, N͂^{0}_{2}, N͂^{0}_{3}, N͂^{0}_{4}
- Antiparticle: self (truly neutral particle)
- Types: 4
- Mass: > 300 GeV
- Electric charge: 0
- Spin: 1/2
- Lepton number: 0
- Baryon number: 0
- R parity: −1

In supersymmetry, the neutralino is a hypothetical particle. In the Minimal Supersymmetric Standard Model (MSSM), a popular model of realization of supersymmetry at a low energy, there are four neutralinos that are fermions and are electrically neutral, the lightest of which is stable in an R-parity conserved scenario of MSSM. They are typically labeled N͂^{0}_{1} (the lightest), N͂^{0}_{2}, N͂^{0}_{3} and N͂^{0}_{4} (the heaviest) although sometimes $\tilde{\chi}_1^0, \ldots, \tilde{\chi}_4^0$ is also used when $\tilde{\chi}_i^\pm$ is used to refer to charginos.

(In this article, C͂^{±}_{1} is used for chargino #1, etc.)

These four states are composites of the bino and the neutral wino (which are the neutral electroweak gauginos), and the neutral higgsinos. As the neutralinos are Majorana fermions, each of them is identical to its antiparticle.

== Expected behavior ==
If they exist, these particles would only interact with the weak vector bosons, so they would not be directly produced at hadron colliders in copious numbers. They would primarily appear as particles in cascade decays (decays that happen in multiple steps) of heavier particles usually originating from colored supersymmetric particles such as squarks or gluinos.

In R-parity conserving models, the lightest neutralino is stable and all supersymmetric cascade-decays end up decaying into this particle which leaves the detector unseen and its existence can only be inferred by looking for unbalanced momentum in a detector.

The heavier neutralinos typically decay through a neutral Z boson to a lighter neutralino or through a charged W boson to a light chargino:

N͂^{0}_{2}	→	N͂^{0}_{1}	+	Z^{0}							→	Missing energy	+	ℓ^{+}	+	ℓ^{−}
N͂^{0}_{2}	→	C͂^{±}_{1}	+	W^{∓}	→	N͂^{0}_{1}	+	W^{±}	+	W^{∓}	→	Missing energy	+	ℓ^{+} + ν_{ℓ}	+	ℓ^{−} + ν̅_{ℓ}

The mass splittings between the different neutralinos will dictate which patterns of decays are allowed.

Up to present, neutralinos have never been observed or detected in an experiment.

== Origins in supersymmetric theories ==
In supersymmetry models, all Standard Model particles have partner particles with the same quantum numbers except for the quantum number spin, which differs by 1/2 from its partner particle. Since the superpartners of the Z boson (zino), the photon (photino) and the neutral higgs (higgsino) have the same quantum numbers, they can mix to form four eigenstates of the mass operator called "neutralinos". In many models the lightest of the four neutralinos turns out to be the lightest supersymmetric particle (LSP), though other particles may also take on this role.

== Phenomenology ==
The exact properties of each neutralino will depend on the details of the mixing (Note: Martin, Stephen P. (2008). "A Supersymmetry Primer". arXiv:hep-ph/9709356v5. Also published in Kane (2010).) (e.g. whether they are more higgsino-like or gaugino-like), but they tend to have masses at the weak scale (100 GeV ~ 1 TeV) and couple to other particles with strengths characteristic of the weak interaction. In this way, except for mass, they are phenomenologically similar to neutrinos, and so are not directly observable in particle detectors at accelerators.

In models in which R-parity is conserved and the lightest of the four neutralinos is the LSP, the lightest neutralino is stable and is eventually produced in the decay chain of all other superpartners. In such cases supersymmetric processes at accelerators are characterized by the expectation of a large discrepancy in energy and momentum between the visible initial and final state particles, with this energy being carried off by a neutralino which departs the detector unnoticed. (Note: Ellis, John; Olive, Keith A. (2010). Supersymmetric Dark Matter Candidates. arXiv:1001.3651. Bibcode:2010pdmo.book..142E. Also published as Chapter 8 in Bertone (2010)) This is an important signature to discriminate supersymmetry from Standard Model backgrounds.

== Relationship to dark matter ==
As a heavy, stable particle, the lightest neutralino is an excellent candidate to form the universe's cold dark matter. In many models the lightest neutralino can be produced thermally in the hot early universe and leave approximately the right relic abundance to account for the observed dark matter. A lightest neutralino of roughly 10–10000 GeV is the leading weakly interacting massive particle (WIMP) dark matter candidate.

Neutralino dark matter could be observed experimentally in nature either indirectly or directly. For indirect observation, gamma ray and neutrino telescopes look for evidence of neutralino annihilation in regions of high dark matter density such as the galactic or solar centre. For direct observation, special purpose experiments such as the Cryogenic Dark Matter Search (CDMS) seek to detect the rare impacts of WIMPs in terrestrial detectors. These experiments have begun to probe interesting supersymmetric parameter space, excluding some models for neutralino dark matter, and upgraded experiments with greater sensitivity are under development.

== See also ==
- List of hypothetical particles
- Lightest supersymmetric particle – Lightest new particle in a supersymmetric model
- Truly neutral particle – Particle that is its own antiparticle because all of its generalized charges are zero
- Weakly interacting slender particle
