= Gluino =

Hypothetical elementary particle; supersymmetric partner of a gluon

In the particle physics theory of supersymmetry, a gluino (symbol g͂) is the hypothetical supersymmetric partner of a gluon.

In supersymmetric theories, gluinos are Majorana fermions and interact via the strong force as a color octet. Gluinos have a lepton number 0, baryon number 0, and spin 1/2.

Experimentally, gluinos have been one of the most promising SUSY particle candidates to be discovered since the production cross-section is the highest among SUSYs in the energy-frontier hadron colliders such as Tevatron and the Large Hadron Collider (LHC). The experimental signatures are typically a pair-produced gluinos and their cascade decays. In models of supersymmetry that conserve R-parity, gluinos eventually decay into the undetected lightest super-symmetric particle with many quarks (looking as jets) and the standard model gauge bosons or Higgs bosons. In the R-parity violating scenarios, gluinos can either decay promptly into multiple jets, or be long-lived leaving anomalous sign of "displaced decay vertices" from the interaction point where they are generated.

There has been no sign of gluinos observed so far. The strongest limit has been set by LHC (ATLAS/CMS) where up to minimum 1 TeV and maximum 2 TeV in gluino mass has been excluded.

== In popular culture ==
In the graphic novel Watchmen, chapter 1, page 23, Dr Manhattan mentions he is about to locate a gluino.
