= Electroweak scale =

Standard energy scale for electroweak processes of 246 GeV

In particle physics, the electroweak scale, also known as the Fermi scale, is the energy scale around 246 GeV, a typical energy of processes described by the electroweak theory. The particular number 246 GeV is taken to be the vacuum expectation value $v = (G_F \sqrt{2})^{-1/2}$ of the Higgs field (where $G_F$ is the Fermi coupling constant). In some cases the term electroweak scale is used to refer to the temperature of electroweak symmetry breaking, 159.5±1.5 GeV. In other cases, the term is used more loosely to refer to energies in a broad range around 10^{2} - 10^{3} GeV. This is within reach of the Large Hadron Collider (LHC), which is designed for about 10^{4} GeV in proton–proton collisions.

Interactions may have been above this scale during the electroweak epoch. In the unextended Standard Model, the transition from the electroweak epoch was not a first or a second order phase transition but a continuous crossover, preventing any baryogenesis. However many extensions to the standard model including supersymmetry and the inert double model have a first order electroweak phase transition (but still lack additional CP violation).

== See also ==
- Hierarchy problem
- Grand unification scale (10^{16} GeV)
- Planck scale (10^{19} GeV)
