= Higgsino =

Supersymmetric partner of the Higgs boson

In particle physics, for models with N = 1 supersymmetry, a higgsino, symbol H͂, is the superpartner of the Higgs field. A higgsino is a Dirac fermionic field with spin 1/2 and it refers to a weak isodoublet with hypercharge half under the Standard Model gauge symmetries. After electroweak symmetry breaking higgsino fields linearly mix with U(1) and SU(2) gauginos leading to four neutralinos and two charginos that refer to physical particles. While the two charginos are charged Dirac fermions (plus and minus each), the neutralinos are electrically neutral Majorana fermions. In an R-parity-conserving version of the Minimal Supersymmetric Standard Model, the lightest neutralino typically becomes the lightest supersymmetric particle (LSP). The LSP is a particle physics candidate for the dark matter of the universe since it cannot decay to particles with lighter mass. A neutralino LSP, depending on its composition can be bino, wino or higgsino dominated in nature and can have different zones of mass values in order to satisfy the estimated dark matter relic density. Commonly, a higgsino dominated LSP is often referred as a higgsino, in spite of the fact that a higgsino is not a physical state in the true sense.

In natural scenarios of SUSY, top squarks, bottom squarks, gluinos, and higgsino-enriched neutralinos and charginos are expected to be relatively light, enhancing their production cross sections. Higgsino searches have been performed by both the ATLAS and CMS experiments at the Large Hadron Collider at CERN, where physicists have searched for the direct electroweak pair production of Higgsinos. As of 2017, no experimental evidence for Higgsinos has been reported.

== Mass ==
If dark matter is composed only of Higgsinos, then the Higgsino mass is 1.1 TeV. On the other hand, if dark matter has multiple components, then the Higgsino mass depends on the relevant multiverse distribution functions, making the mass of the Higgsino lighter.

m_{ħ} ≈ 1.1 (Ω_{ħ}/Ω_{DM})^{1/2} TeV
