= Supersymmetry =

Symmetry between bosons and fermions

Supersymmetry is a theoretical framework in physics that suggests the existence of a symmetry between particles with integer spin (bosons) and particles with half-integer spin (fermions). It proposes that for every known particle, there exists a partner particle with different spin properties. There have been multiple experiments on supersymmetry that have failed to provide evidence that it exists in nature. If evidence is found, supersymmetry could help explain certain phenomena, such as the nature of dark matter and the hierarchy problem in particle physics.

A supersymmetric theory is a theory in which the equations for force and the equations for matter are identical. In theoretical and mathematical physics, any theory with this property has the principle of supersymmetry (SUSY). Dozens of supersymmetric theories exist. In theory, supersymmetry is a type of spacetime symmetry between two basic classes of particles: bosons, which have an integer-valued spin and follow Bose–Einstein statistics, and fermions, which have a half-integer-valued spin and follow Fermi–Dirac statistics. The names of bosonic partners of fermions are prefixed with s-, because they are scalar particles. For example, if the electron existed in a supersymmetric theory, then there would be a particle called a selectron (superpartner electron), a bosonic partner of the electron.

In supersymmetry, each particle from the class of fermions would have an associated particle in the class of bosons, and vice versa, known as a superpartner. The spin of a particle's superpartner is different by a half-integer. In the simplest supersymmetry theories, with perfectly "unbroken" supersymmetry, each pair of superpartners would share the same mass and internal quantum numbers besides spin. More complex supersymmetry theories have a spontaneously broken symmetry, allowing superpartners to differ in mass.

Supersymmetry could have applications to different areas of physics, such as quantum mechanics, statistical mechanics, quantum field theory, condensed matter physics, nuclear physics, optics, stochastic dynamics, astrophysics, quantum gravity, and cosmology. Supersymmetry has also been applied to high-energy physics, where a supersymmetric extension of the Standard Model is a possible candidate for physics beyond the Standard Model. However, no supersymmetric extensions of the Standard Model have been experimentally verified, and some physicists argue the theory is dead.

== History ==
A supersymmetry relating mesons and baryons was first proposed, in the context of hadronic physics, by Hironari Miyazawa in 1966. This supersymmetry did not involve spacetime, that is, it concerned internal symmetry, and was broken badly. Miyazawa's work was largely ignored at the time.

J. L. Gervais and B. Sakita (in 1971), Yu. A. Golfand and E. P. Likhtman (also in 1971), and D. V. Volkov and V. P. Akulov (1972), independently rediscovered supersymmetry in the context of quantum field theory, a radically new type of symmetry of spacetime and fundamental fields, which establishes a relationship between elementary particles of different quantum nature, bosons and fermions, and unifies spacetime and internal symmetries of microscopic phenomena. Supersymmetry with a consistent Lie-algebraic graded structure on which the Gervais−Sakita rediscovery was based directly first arose in 1971 in the context of an early version of string theory by Pierre Ramond, John H. Schwarz and André Neveu.

In 1974, Julius Wess and Bruno Zumino identified the characteristic renormalization features of four-dimensional supersymmetric field theories, which identified them as remarkable QFTs, and they and Abdus Salam and their fellow researchers introduced early particle physics applications. The mathematical structure of supersymmetry (Lie superalgebras) has subsequently been applied successfully to other topics of physics, ranging from nuclear physics, critical phenomena, quantum mechanics to statistical physics, and supersymmetry remains a vital part of many proposed theories in many branches of physics.

In particle physics, the first realistic supersymmetric version of the Standard Model was proposed in 1977 by Pierre Fayet and is known as the Minimal Supersymmetric Standard Model or MSSM for short. It was proposed to solve, amongst other things, the hierarchy problem.

Supersymmetry was coined by Abdus Salam and John Strathdee in 1974 as a simplification of the term super-gauge symmetry used by Wess and Zumino, although Zumino also used the same term at around the same time. The term supergauge was in turn coined by Neveu and Schwarz in 1971 when they devised supersymmetry in the context of string theory.

== Applications ==
=== Extension of possible symmetry groups ===
One reason that physicists explored supersymmetry is because it offers an extension to the more familiar symmetries of quantum field theory. These symmetries are grouped into the Poincaré group and internal symmetries and the Coleman–Mandula theorem showed that under certain assumptions, the symmetries of the S-matrix must be a direct product of the Poincaré group with a compact internal symmetry group or if there is not any mass gap, the conformal group with a compact internal symmetry group. In 1971 Golfand and Likhtman were the first to show that the Poincaré algebra can be extended through introduction of four anticommuting spinor generators (in four dimensions), which later became known as supercharges. In 1975, the Haag–Łopuszański–Sohnius theorem analyzed all possible superalgebras in the general form, including those with an extended number of the supergenerators and central charges. This extended super-Poincaré algebra paved the way for obtaining a very large and important class of supersymmetric field theories.

==== Supersymmetry algebra ====
Traditional symmetries of physics are generated by objects that transform by the tensor representations of the Poincaré group and internal symmetries. Supersymmetries, however, are generated by objects that transform by the spin representations. According to the spin-statistics theorem, bosonic fields commute while fermionic fields anticommute. Combining the two kinds of fields into a single algebra requires the introduction of a Z_{2}-grading under which the bosons are the even elements and the fermions are the odd elements. Such an algebra is called a Lie superalgebra.

The simplest supersymmetric extension of the Poincaré algebra is the Super-Poincaré algebra. Expressed in terms of two Weyl spinors, has the following anti-commutation relation:

$$\{ Q_{ \alpha }, \bar {Q}_{ \dot{ \beta }} \} = 2( \sigma^{\mu} )_{ \alpha \dot{ \beta }} P_{\mu}$$

and all other anti-commutation relations between the $Q$s and commutation relations between the $Q$s and $P$s vanish. In the above expression $P_\mu = -i \partial_\mu$ are the generators of translation and $\sigma^\mu$ are the Pauli matrices.

There are representations of a Lie superalgebra that are analogous to representations of a Lie algebra. Each Lie algebra has an associated Lie group and a Lie superalgebra can sometimes be extended into representations of a Lie supergroup.

=== Supersymmetric quantum mechanics ===
Supersymmetric quantum mechanics adds the SUSY superalgebra to quantum mechanics as opposed to quantum field theory. Supersymmetric quantum mechanics often becomes relevant when studying the dynamics of supersymmetric solitons, and due to the simplified nature of having fields which are only functions of time (rather than space-time), a great deal of progress has been made in this subject and it is now studied in its own right.

SUSY quantum mechanics involves pairs of Hamiltonians which share a particular mathematical relationship, which are called partner Hamiltonians. (The potential energy terms which occur in the Hamiltonians are then known as partner potentials.) An introductory theorem shows that for every eigenstate of one Hamiltonian, its partner Hamiltonian has a corresponding eigenstate with the same energy. This fact can be exploited to deduce many properties of the eigenstate spectrum. It is analogous to the original description of SUSY, which referred to bosons and fermions. We can imagine a "bosonic Hamiltonian", whose eigenstates are the various bosons of our theory. The SUSY partner of this Hamiltonian would be "fermionic", and its eigenstates would be the theory's fermions. Each boson would have a fermionic partner of equal energy.

=== Supersymmetry in quantum field theory ===
In quantum field theory, supersymmetry is motivated by solutions to several theoretical problems, for generally providing many desirable mathematical properties, and for ensuring sensible behavior at high energies. Supersymmetric quantum field theory is often much easier to analyze, as many more problems become mathematically tractable. When supersymmetry is imposed as a local symmetry, Einstein's theory of general relativity is included automatically, and the result is said to be a theory of supergravity. Another theoretically appealing property of supersymmetry is that it offers the only "loophole" to the Coleman–Mandula theorem, which prohibits spacetime and internal symmetries from being combined in any nontrivial way, for quantum field theories with very general assumptions. The Haag–Łopuszański–Sohnius theorem demonstrates that supersymmetry is the only way spacetime and internal symmetries can be combined consistently.

While supersymmetry has not been discovered at high energy, see Section Supersymmetry in particle physics, supersymmetry was found to be effectively realized at the intermediate energy of hadronic physics where baryons and mesons are superpartners. An exception is the pion that appears as a zero mode in the mass spectrum and thus protected by the supersymmetry: It has no baryonic partner. The realization of this effective supersymmetry is readily explained in quark–diquark models: Because two different color charges close together (e.g., blue and red) appear under coarse resolution as the corresponding anti-color (e.g. anti-green), a diquark cluster viewed with coarse resolution (i.e., at the energy-momentum scale used to study hadron structure) effectively appears as an antiquark. Therefore, a baryon containing 3 valence quarks, of which two tend to cluster together as a diquark, behaves like a meson.

=== Supersymmetry in condensed matter physics ===
SUSY concepts have provided useful extensions to the WKB approximation. Additionally, SUSY has been applied to disorder averaged systems both quantum and non-quantum (through statistical mechanics), the Fokker–Planck equation being an example of a non-quantum theory. The 'supersymmetry' in all these systems arises from the fact that one is modelling one particle and as such the 'statistics' do not matter. The use of the supersymmetry method provides a mathematical rigorous alternative to the replica trick, but only in non-interacting systems, which attempts to address the so-called 'problem of the denominator' under disorder averaging. For more on the applications of supersymmetry in condensed matter physics see Efetov (1997).

In 2021, a group of researchers showed that, in theory, $N=(0,1)$ SUSY could be realised at the edge of a Moore–Read quantum Hall state. However, to date, no experiments have been done yet to realise it at an edge of a Moore–Read state. In 2022, a different group of researchers created a computer simulation of atoms in 1 dimensions that had supersymmetric topological quasiparticles.

=== Supersymmetry in optics ===
In 2013, integrated optics was found to provide a fertile ground on which certain ramifications of SUSY can be explored in readily-accessible laboratory settings. Making use of the analogous mathematical structure of the quantum-mechanical Schrödinger equation and the wave equation governing the evolution of light in one-dimensional settings, one may interpret the refractive index distribution of a structure as a potential landscape in which optical wave packets propagate. In this manner, a new class of functional optical structures with possible applications in phase matching, mode conversion and space-division multiplexing becomes possible. SUSY transformations have been also proposed as a way to address inverse scattering problems in optics and as a one-dimensional transformation optics.

=== Supersymmetry in dynamical systems ===
All stochastic (partial) differential equations, the models for all types of continuous time dynamical systems, possess topological supersymmetry. In the operator representation of stochastic evolution, the topological supersymmetry is the exterior derivative which is commutative with the stochastic evolution operator defined as the stochastically averaged pullback induced on differential forms by SDE-defined diffeomorphisms of the phase space. The topological sector of the so-emerging supersymmetric theory of stochastic dynamics can be recognized as the Witten-type topological field theory.

The meaning of the topological supersymmetry in dynamical systems is the preservation of the phase space continuity—infinitely close points will remain close during continuous time evolution even in the presence of noise. When the topological supersymmetry is broken spontaneously, this property is violated in the limit of the infinitely long temporal evolution and the model can be said to exhibit (the stochastic generalization of) the butterfly effect. From a more general perspective, spontaneous breakdown of the topological supersymmetry is the theoretical essence of the ubiquitous dynamical phenomenon variously known as chaos, turbulence, self-organized criticality etc. The Goldstone theorem explains the associated emergence of the long-range dynamical behavior that manifests itself as 1/f noise, butterfly effect, and the scale-free statistics of sudden (instantonic) processes, such as earthquakes, neuroavalanches, and solar flares, known as the Zipf's law and the Richter scale.

==== In finance ====
In 2021, supersymmetric quantum mechanics was applied to option pricing and the analysis of markets in finance, and to financial networks.

=== Supersymmetry in mathematics ===
SUSY is also sometimes studied mathematically for its intrinsic properties. This is because it describes complex fields satisfying a property known as holomorphy, which allows holomorphic quantities to be exactly computed. This makes supersymmetric models useful "toy models" of more realistic theories. A prime example of this has been the demonstration of S-duality in four-dimensional gauge theories that interchanges particles and monopoles.

The proof of the Atiyah–Singer index theorem is much simplified by the use of supersymmetric quantum mechanics.

=== Supersymmetry in string theory ===
Supersymmetry is an integral part of string theory, a possible theory of everything. There are two types of string theory, supersymmetric string theory or superstring theory, and non-supersymmetric string theory. By definition of superstring theory, supersymmetry is required in superstring theory at some level. However, even in non-supersymmetric string theory, a type of supersymmetry called misaligned supersymmetry is still required in the theory in order to ensure no physical tachyons appear. Any string theories without some kind of supersymmetry, such as bosonic string theory and the $E_7 \times E_7$, $SU(16)$, and $E_8$ heterotic string theories, will have a tachyon and therefore the spacetime vacuum itself would be unstable and would decay into some tachyon-free string theory usually in a lower spacetime dimension. There is no experimental evidence that either supersymmetry or misaligned supersymmetry holds in our universe, and many physicists have moved on from supersymmetry and string theory entirely due to the non-detection of supersymmetry at the LHC.

Despite the null results for supersymmetry at the LHC so far, some particle physicists have nevertheless moved to string theory in order to resolve the naturalness crisis for certain supersymmetric extensions of the Standard Model. According to the particle physicists, there exists a concept of "stringy naturalness" in string theory, where the string theory landscape could have a power law statistical pull on soft SUSY breaking terms to large values (depending on the number of hidden sector SUSY breaking fields contributing to the soft terms). If this is coupled with an anthropic requirement that contributions to the weak scale not exceed a factor between 2 and 5 from its measured value (as argued by Agrawal et al.), then the Higgs mass is pulled up to the vicinity of 125 GeV while most sparticles are pulled to values beyond the current reach of LHC. (The Higgs was determined to have a mass of 125 GeV ±0.15 GeV in 2022.) An exception occurs for higgsinos which gain mass not from SUSY breaking but rather from whatever mechanism solves the SUSY mu problem. Light higgsino pair production in association with hard initial state jet radiation leads to a soft opposite-sign dilepton plus jet plus missing transverse energy signal.

== Supersymmetry in particle physics ==
In particle physics, a supersymmetric extension of the Standard Model is a possible candidate for undiscovered particle physics, and seen by some physicists as an elegant solution to many current problems in particle physics if confirmed correct, which could resolve various areas where current theories are believed to be incomplete and where limitations of current theories are well established. In particular, one supersymmetric extension of the Standard Model, the Minimal Supersymmetric Standard Model (MSSM), became popular in theoretical particle physics, as the Minimal Supersymmetric Standard Model is the simplest supersymmetric extension of the Standard Model that could resolve major hierarchy problems within the Standard Model, by guaranteeing that quadratic divergences of all orders will cancel out in perturbation theory. If a supersymmetric extension of the Standard Model is correct, superpartners of the existing elementary particles would be new and undiscovered particles and supersymmetry is expected to be spontaneously broken.

There is no experimental evidence that a supersymmetric extension to the Standard Model is correct, or whether or not other extensions to current models might be more accurate. It is only since around 2010 that particle accelerators specifically designed to study physics beyond the Standard Model have become operational (i.e. the Large Hadron Collider (LHC)), and it is not known where exactly to look, nor the energies required for a successful search. However, the negative results from the LHC since 2010 have already ruled out some supersymmetric extensions to the Standard Model, and many physicists believe that the Minimal Supersymmetric Standard Model, while not ruled out, is no longer able to fully resolve the hierarchy problem.

=== Supersymmetric extensions of the Standard Model ===
Incorporating supersymmetry into the Standard Model requires doubling the number of particles since there is no way that any of the particles in the Standard Model can be superpartners of each other. With the addition of new particles, there are many possible new interactions. The simplest possible supersymmetric model consistent with the Standard Model is the Minimal Supersymmetric Standard Model (MSSM) which can include the necessary additional new particles that are able to be superpartners of those in the Standard Model.

Cancellation of the Higgs boson quadratic mass renormalization between fermionic top quark loop and scalar stop squark tadpole Feynman diagrams in a supersymmetric extension of the Standard Model

One of the original motivations for the Minimal Supersymmetric Standard Model came from the hierarchy problem. Due to the quadratically divergent contributions to the Higgs mass squared in the Standard Model, the quantum mechanical interactions of the Higgs boson causes a large renormalization of the Higgs mass and unless there is an accidental cancellation, the natural size of the Higgs mass is the greatest scale possible. Furthermore, the electroweak scale receives enormous Planck-scale quantum corrections. The observed hierarchy between the electroweak scale and the Planck scale must be achieved with extraordinary fine tuning. This problem is known as the hierarchy problem.

Supersymmetry close to the electroweak scale, such as in the Minimal Supersymmetric Standard Model, would solve the hierarchy problem that afflicts the Standard Model. It would reduce the size of the quantum corrections by having automatic cancellations between fermionic and bosonic Higgs interactions, and Planck-scale quantum corrections cancel between partners and superpartners (owing to a minus sign associated with fermionic loops). The hierarchy between the electroweak scale and the Planck scale would be achieved in a natural manner, without extraordinary fine-tuning. If supersymmetry were restored at the weak scale, then the Higgs mass would be related to supersymmetry breaking which can be induced from small non-perturbative effects explaining the vastly different scales in the weak interactions and gravitational interactions.

Another motivation for the Minimal Supersymmetric Standard Model comes from grand unification, the idea that the gauge symmetry groups should unify at high-energy. In the Standard Model, however, the weak, strong and electromagnetic gauge couplings fail to unify at high energy. In particular, the renormalization group evolution of the three gauge coupling constants of the Standard Model is somewhat sensitive to the present particle content of the theory. These coupling constants do not quite meet together at a common energy scale if we run the renormalization group using the Standard Model. After incorporating minimal SUSY at the electroweak scale, the running of the gauge couplings are modified, and joint convergence of the gauge coupling constants is projected to occur at approximately 10^{16} GeV. The modified running also provides a natural mechanism for radiative electroweak symmetry breaking.

In many supersymmetric extensions of the Standard Model, such as the Minimal Supersymmetric Standard Model, there is a heavy stable particle (such as the neutralino) which could serve as a weakly interacting massive particle (WIMP) dark matter candidate. The existence of a supersymmetric dark matter candidate is related closely to R-parity. Supersymmetry at the electroweak scale (augmented with a discrete symmetry) typically provides a candidate dark matter particle at a mass scale consistent with thermal relic abundance calculations.

The standard paradigm for incorporating supersymmetry into a realistic theory is to have the underlying dynamics of the theory be supersymmetric, but the ground state of the theory does not respect the symmetry and supersymmetry is broken spontaneously. The supersymmetry break can not be done permanently by the particles of the MSSM as they currently appear. This means that there is a new sector of the theory that is responsible for the breaking. The only constraint on this new sector is that it must break supersymmetry permanently and must give superparticles TeV scale masses. There are many models that can do this and most of their details do not matter. In order to parameterize the relevant features of supersymmetry breaking, arbitrary soft SUSY breaking terms are added to the theory which temporarily break SUSY explicitly but could never arise from a complete theory of supersymmetry breaking.

Supersymmetric (SUSY) sparticles
Sfermions Spin = integer Superpartners of fermions	Sbosons Spin = half-integer Superpartners of bosons
Squarks Spin = 0 Superpartners of quarks	Sleptons Spin = 0 Superpartners of leptons	Gauginos Spin = 1/2 Superpartners of gauge bosons	Higgsinos Spin = 1/2 Superpartners of the Higgs boson
Three generations of squarks: 1. Up squark ($\tilde{u}$), Down squark ($\tilde{d}$); 2. Charm squark ($\tilde{c}$), Strange squark ($\tilde{s}$); 3. Top squark ($\tilde{t}$), Bottom squark ($\tilde{b}$)	Three generations of sleptons: 1. Selectron ($\tilde{e}$), Electron sneutrino ($\tilde{\nu}_e$); 2. Smuon ($\tilde{\mu}$), Muon sneutrino ($\tilde{\nu}_\mu$); 3. Stau ($\tilde{\tau}$), Tau sneutrino ($\tilde{\nu}_\tau$)	Several kinds of gauginos: 1. Gluino ($\tilde{g}$); superpartner of the Gluon; 2. Wino ($\tilde{W}$); superpartner of the W boson 3. Bino ($\tilde{B}$); superpartner of the B boson/ sometimes identified with the Photon or Z boson mixture; Gravitino ($\tilde{G}$); Spin = 3/2; superpartner of the (hypothetical) Graviton	Charged and neutral combinations: Charginos ($\tilde{\chi}^\pm$); Neutralinos ($\tilde{\chi}^0$)

All of these supersymmetric partners (sparticles) are hypothetical and have not been observed experimentally. They are predicted by various supersymmetric extensions of the Standard Model.

=== Searches and constraints for supersymmetry ===
SUSY extensions of the Standard Model are constrained by a variety of experiments, including measurements of low-energy observables – for example, the anomalous magnetic moment of the muon at Fermilab; the WMAP dark matter density measurement and direct detection experiments – for example, XENON-100 and LUX; and by particle collider experiments, including B-physics, Higgs phenomenology and direct searches for superpartners (sparticles), at the Large Electron–Positron Collider, Tevatron and the LHC. In fact, CERN publicly states that if a supersymmetric model of the Standard Model "is correct, supersymmetric particles should appear in collisions at the LHC".

Historically, the tightest limits were from direct production at colliders. The first mass limits for squarks and gluinos were made at CERN by the UA1 experiment and the UA2 experiment at the Super Proton Synchrotron. LEP later set very strong limits, which in 2006 were extended by the D0 experiment at the Tevatron. From 2003 to 2015, WMAP's and Planck's dark matter density measurements have strongly constrained supersymmetric extensions of the Standard Model, which, if they explain dark matter, have to be tuned to invoke a particular mechanism to sufficiently reduce the neutralino density.

Prior to the beginning of the LHC, in 2009, fits of available data to CMSSM and NUHM1 indicated that squarks and gluinos were most likely to have masses in the 500 to 800 GeV range, though values as high as 2.5 TeV were allowed with low probabilities. Neutralinos and sleptons were expected to be quite light, with the lightest neutralino and the lightest stau most likely to be found between 100 and 150 GeV.

The first runs of the LHC surpassed existing experimental limits from the Large Electron–Positron Collider and Tevatron and partially excluded the aforementioned expected ranges. In 2011–12, the LHC discovered a Higgs boson with a mass of about 125 GeV, and with couplings to fermions and bosons which are consistent with the Standard Model. The MSSM predicts that the mass of the lightest Higgs boson should not be much higher than the mass of the Z boson, and, in the absence of fine tuning (with the supersymmetry breaking scale on the order of 1 TeV), should not exceed 135 GeV. The LHC found no previously unknown particles other than the Higgs boson which was already suspected to exist as part of the Standard Model, and therefore no evidence for any supersymmetric extension of the Standard Model.

Indirect methods include the search for a permanent electric dipole moment (EDM) in the known Standard Model particles, which can arise when the Standard Model particle interacts with the supersymmetric particles. The current best constraint on the electron electric dipole moment put it to be smaller than 10^{−28} e·cm, equivalent to a sensitivity to new physics at the TeV scale and matching that of the current best particle colliders. A permanent EDM in any fundamental particle points towards time-reversal violating physics, and therefore also CP-symmetry violation via the CPT theorem. Such EDM experiments are also much more scalable than conventional particle accelerators and offer a practical alternative to detecting physics beyond the Standard Model as accelerator experiments become increasingly costly and complicated to maintain. The current best limit for the electron's EDM has already reached a sensitivity to rule out so called 'naive' versions of supersymmetric extensions of the Standard Model.

Research in the late 2010s and early 2020s from experimental data on the cosmological constant, LIGO noise, and pulsar timing, suggests it's very unlikely that there are any new particles with masses much higher than those which can be found in the Standard Model or the LHC. However, this research has also indicated that quantum gravity or perturbative quantum field theory will become strongly coupled before 1 PeV, leading to other new physics in the TeVs.

=== Current status ===
The negative findings in the experiments disappointed many physicists, who believed that supersymmetric extensions of the Standard Model (and other theories relying upon it) were by far the most promising theories for "new" physics beyond the Standard Model, and had hoped for signs of unexpected results from the experiments. In particular, the LHC result seems problematic for the Minimal Supersymmetric Standard Model, as the value of 125 GeV is relatively large for the model and can only be achieved with large radiative loop corrections from top squarks, which many theorists consider to be "unnatural" (see naturalness and fine tuning).

In response to the so-called "naturalness crisis" in the Minimal Supersymmetric Standard Model, some researchers have abandoned naturalness and the original motivation to solve the hierarchy problem naturally with supersymmetry, while other researchers have moved on to other supersymmetric models such as split supersymmetry. Still others have moved to string theory as a result of the naturalness crisis. Former enthusiastic supporter Mikhail Shifman went as far as urging the theoretical community to search for new ideas and accept that supersymmetry was a failed theory in particle physics. However, some researchers suggested that this "naturalness" crisis was premature because various calculations were too optimistic about the limits of masses which would allow a supersymmetric extension of the Standard Model as a solution.

== General supersymmetry ==
Supersymmetry appears in many related contexts of theoretical physics. It is possible to have multiple supersymmetries and also have supersymmetric extra dimensions.

=== Extended supersymmetry ===
It is possible to have more than one kind of supersymmetry transformation. Theories with more than one supersymmetry transformation are known as extended supersymmetric theories. The more supersymmetry a theory has, the more constrained are the field content and interactions. Typically the number of copies of a supersymmetry, denoted as N, is a power of 2 (1, 2, 4, 8...). In four dimensions, a spinor has four degrees of freedom and thus the minimal number of supersymmetry generators is four in four dimensions and having eight copies of supersymmetry means that there are 32 supersymmetry generators.

The maximal number of supersymmetry generators possible is 32. Theories with more than 32 supersymmetry generators automatically have massless fields with spin greater than 2. It is not known how to make massless fields with spin greater than two interact, so the maximal number of supersymmetry generators considered is 32. This is due to the Weinberg–Witten theorem. Theories with 32 supersymmetries automatically have a graviton.

For four dimensions there are the following theories, with the corresponding multiplets (CPT adds a copy, whenever they are not invariant under such symmetry):

N = 1	Chiral multiplet	(0,	1/2)							
N = 1	Vector multiplet	(1/2,	1)							
N = 1	Gravitino multiplet	(1,	3/2)							
N = 1	Graviton multiplet	(3/2,	2)							
N = 2	Hypermultiplet	(−1/2,	0^{2},	1/2)						
N = 2	Vector multiplet	(0,	1/2 ^{2},	1)						
N = 2	Supergravity multiplet	(1,	3/2 ^{2},	2)						
N = 4	Vector multiplet	(−1,	−1/2 ^{4},	0^{6},	1/2 ^{4},	1)				
N = 4	Supergravity multiplet	(0,	1/2 ^{4},	1^{6},	3/2 ^{4},	2)				
N = 8	Supergravity multiplet	(−2,	−3/2 ^{8},	−1^{28},	−1/2 ^{56},	0^{70},	1/2 ^{56},	1^{28},	3/2 ^{8},	2)

=== Supersymmetry in alternate numbers of dimensions ===
It is possible to have supersymmetry in dimensions other than four. Because the properties of spinors change drastically between different dimensions, each dimension has its characteristic. In d dimensions, the size of spinors is approximately 2^{d/2} or 2^{(d−1)/2}. Since the maximum number of supersymmetries is 32, the greatest number of dimensions in which a supersymmetric theory can exist is eleven.

=== Fractional supersymmetry ===
Fractional supersymmetry is a generalization of the notion of supersymmetry in which the minimal positive amount of spin does not have to be 1/2 but can be an arbitrary 1/N for integer value of N. Such a generalization is possible in two or fewer spacetime dimensions.

== See also ==
- 4D N = 1 global supersymmetry
- Anyon
- Next-to-Minimal Supersymmetric Standard Model
- Quantum group
- Split supersymmetry
- Supercharge
- Supermultiplet
- Supergeometry
- Supergravity
- Supergroup
- Superpartner
- Superspace
- Supersplit supersymmetry
- Supersymmetric gauge theory
- Supersymmetry nonrenormalization theorems
- Wess–Zumino model
