= DarkSide (dark matter experiment) =

Physics experiment to detect dark matter

- DarkSide

The DarkSide collaboration is an international affiliation of universities and labs seeking to directly detect dark matter in the form of weakly interacting massive particles (WIMPs). The collaboration is planning, building and operating a series of liquid argon time projection chambers (TPCs) that are employed at the Gran Sasso National Laboratory in Assergi, Italy. The detectors are filled with liquid argon from underground sources in order to exclude the radioactive isotope ^{39}Ar, which makes up one in every 10^{15} (quadrillion) atoms in atmospheric argon. The Darkside-10 (DS-10) prototype was tested in 2012, and the Darkside-50 (DS-50) experiment has been operating since 2013. Darkside-20k (DS-20k) with 20 tonnes (20,000 kg) of liquid argon is being planned as of 2019.

== Darkside-10 ==
The Darkside-10 prototype detector had 10 kg of liquid argon. It was built at Princeton University and operated there for seven months, after which it was transported to Gran Sasso National Laboratory in 2011. The detector operated in Gran Sasso 2011-2012.

== Status ==
Darkside-50 has 46 kg argon target mass. A 3-year run is planned and ton-scale expansion has been proposed.

Initial results using a month of running were reported in 2014. Spin-independent limits were set using 1422 kg×days of exposure to atmospheric argon. A cross section limit of 6.1×10^{−44} cm^{2} for a 100 Gev WIMP was found.

== Members ==
The following institutions' physics departments include members of DarkSide:

- Augustana College, USA
- Black Hills State University, USA
- Drexel University, USA
- Fermi National Accelerator Laboratory, USA
- Fort Lewis College, USA
- Institute for Nuclear Research, Kyiv, Ukraine
- Princeton University, USA
- Temple University, USA
- University of Arkansas, USA
- University of Alberta, Canada
- University of California, Los Angeles, USA
- University of California, Davis, USA
- University of Chicago, USA
- University of Houston, USA
- University of Massachusetts at Amherst, USA
- University of Hawaii, USA
- Virginia Tech, USA
- Williams College, USA
- University College London, GB
- University of Oxford, GB
- Royal Holloway, University of London, GB
- INFN – Laboratori Nazionali del Gran Sasso, Italy
- INFN – Università degli Studi di Genova, Italy
- INFN – Università degli Studi di Milano, Italy
- INFN – Università degli Studi di Napoli, Italy
- INFN – Università degli Studi di Perugia, Italy
- INFN – Università degli Studi di Cagliari, Italy
- GSSI – Gran Sasso Science Institute, Italy
- CERN – The European Organization for Nuclear Research, Switzerland/France
- Jagiellonian University, Cracow, Poland
- Belgorod State University, Russia
- Joint Institute for Nuclear Research, Dubna, Russia
- Lomonosov Moscow State University, Russia
- Novosibirsk State University, Russia Kurchatov Institute, Russia
- National Research Nuclear University, Moscow, Russia
- Institute for Theoretical and Experimental Physics, Moscow, Russia
- St. Petersburg Nuclear Physics Institute, Gatchina, Russia

== See also ==
- ANAIS
- ArDM
- CDEX
- CDMS
- CRESST
- DAMA/NaI
- DAMA/LIBRA
- DEAP
- DRIFT
- EDELWEISS
- LZ experiment
- LUX
- PICASSO
- SIMPLE
- WARP
- XENON
- ZEPLIN

== Publications ==
- Akimov, D.; et al. (2012). "Light Yield in DarkSide-10: A Prototype Two-phase Liquid Argon TPC for Dark Matter Searches". arXiv:1204.6218v1 [astro-ph.IM].
- Back, H. O.; et al. (2012). "First Large Scale Production of Low Radioactivity Argon from Underground Sources". arXiv:1204.6024 [astro-ph.IM].
- Back, H. O.; et al. (2012). "First Commissioning of a Cryogenic Distillation Column for Low Radioactivity Underground Argon". arXiv:1204.6061v2 [astro-ph.IM].
- Xu, J.; et al. (2015). "A study of the trace ^{39}Ar content in argon from deep underground sources". Astroparticle Physics. 66: 53–60. arXiv:1204.6011. Bibcode:2015APh....66...53X. doi:10.1016/j.astropartphys.2015.01.002. S2CID 117711599.
- Wright, Alex; Mosteiro, Pablo; Loer, Ben; Calaprice, Frank (2011). "A highly efficient neutron veto for dark matter experiments". Nuclear Instruments and Methods in Physics Research Section A. 644 (1): 18–26. arXiv:1010.3609. Bibcode:2011NIMPA.644...18W. doi:10.1016/j.nima.2011.04.009. S2CID 118467340.
- DarkSide Collaboration, "DarkSide-50 Proposal " (2008).
- Galbiati, C.; et al. (2008). "Discovery of underground argon with a low level of radioactive ^{39}Ar and possible applications to WIMP dark matter detectors". Journal of Physics: Conference Series. 120 (4) 042015. arXiv:0712.0381. Bibcode:2008JPhCS.120d2015G. doi:10.1088/1742-6596/120/4/042015. S2CID 118355785.
