= Mirror matter =

Hypothetical counterpart to ordinary matter

In theoretical physics, mirror matter, also called shadow matter or Alice matter, is a hypothetical counterpart to ordinary matter that mirrors the properties of ordinary matter but interacts with it only via gravity or weak interaction.

== Overview ==
Modern physics deals with three basic types of spatial symmetry: reflection, rotation, and translation. The known elementary particles respect rotational symmetry and translational symmetry but some do not respect mirror reflection symmetry (also called P-symmetry or parity). Of the four fundamental interactions—electromagnetism, the strong interaction, the weak interaction, and gravity—only the weak interaction breaks parity.

Parity violation in weak interactions was first postulated by Tsung-Dao Lee and Chen-Ning Yang in 1956 as a solution to the τ-θ puzzle. In consultation with the experimental physicist Chien-Shiung Wu a number of possibilities were proposed to test whether the weak interaction was in fact invariant under parity. One of the group's suggestions involved monitoring the decay of cobalt-60,

${}^{60}_{27}\text{Co} \rightarrow {}^{60}_{28}\text{Ni} + e^- + \bar{\nu}_e + 2{\gamma}$

to determine whether the electrons it emitted were radiated isotropically, like the two gamma rays. Wu performed this experiment at the National Bureau of Standards in Washington, D.C. after nine months of work. Contrary to most expectations, in December 1956 she and her team observed anisotropic electron radiation, proving that the weak interactions of the known particles violate parity.

However, parity symmetry can be restored as a fundamental symmetry of nature if the particle content is enlarged so that every particle has a mirror partner. The theory in its modern form was described in 1991, although the basic idea dates back further. Mirror particles interact amongst themselves in the same way as ordinary particles, except where ordinary particles have left-handed interactions, mirror particles have right-handed interactions. In this way, it turns out that mirror reflection symmetry can exist as an exact symmetry of nature, provided that a "mirror" particle exists for every ordinary particle. Parity can also be spontaneously broken depending on the Higgs potential. While in the case of unbroken parity symmetry the masses of particles are the same as their mirror partners, in case of broken parity symmetry the mirror partners are lighter or heavier.

Mirror matter, if it exists, would interact weakly in strength with ordinary matter. This is because the forces between mirror particles are mediated by mirror bosons. With the exception of the graviton, none of the known bosons can be identical to their mirror partners. The only way mirror matter can interact with ordinary matter via forces other than gravity is via kinetic mixing of mirror bosons with ordinary bosons. These interactions can only be very weak. Mirror particles have therefore been suggested as candidates for the inferred dark matter in the universe.

In another context, mirror matter has been proposed to give rise to an effective Higgs mechanism responsible for the electroweak symmetry breaking. In such a scenario, mirror fermions acquire masses on the order of 1 TeV since they interact with an additional gauge interaction not only becoming strong around the characteristic energy scale of the electroweak interactions but also being theoretically unified with Standard Model interactions under a larger gauge symmetry near the Planck energy scale. In order to emphasize the distinction of this model from the ones above, these mirror particles are usually called katoptrons within the context of the Katoptron model and they are expected to decay to Standard Model particles shortly after their creation.

== Observational effects ==
=== Abundance ===
Mirror matter could have been diluted to unobservably low densities during the inflation epoch. Sheldon Glashow has shown that if, at some high energy scale, particles exist which interact strongly with both ordinary and mirror particles, radiative corrections will lead to a mixing between photons and mirror photons. This mixing has the effect of giving mirror electric charges a very small ordinary electric charge. Another effect of photon–mirror photon mixing is that it induces oscillations between positronium and mirror positronium. Positronium could then turn into mirror positronium and then decay into mirror photons.

The mixing between photons and mirror photons could be present in tree-level Feynman diagrams or arise as a consequence of quantum corrections due to the presence of particles that carry both ordinary and mirror charges. In the latter case, the quantum corrections have to vanish at the one and two loop-level Feynman diagrams, otherwise the predicted value of the kinetic mixing parameter would be larger than experimentally allowed.

An experiment to measure this effect was being planned in November 2003.

=== Dark matter ===
If mirror matter does exist in large abundances in the universe and if it interacts with ordinary matter via photon—mirror photon mixing, then this could be detected in dark matter direct detection experiments such as DAMA/NaI and its successor DAMA/LIBRA. In fact, it is one of the few dark matter candidates which can explain the positive DAMA/NaI dark matter signal whilst still being consistent with the null results of other dark matter experiments.

=== Electromagnetic effects ===
Mirror matter may also be detected in electromagnetic field penetration experiments and there would also be consequences for planetary science and astrophysics.

=== GZK puzzle ===
Mirror matter could also be responsible for the GZK puzzle. Topological defects in the mirror sector could produce mirror neutrinos which can oscillate to ordinary neutrinos. Another possible way to evade the GZK bound is via neutron–mirror neutron oscillations.

=== Gravitational effects ===
If mirror matter is present in the universe with sufficient abundance then its gravitational effects can be detected. Because mirror matter is analogous to ordinary matter, it is then to be expected that a fraction of the mirror matter exists in the form of mirror galaxies, mirror stars, mirror planets etc. These objects can be detected using gravitational microlensing. One would also expect that some fraction of stars have mirror objects as their companion. In such cases one should be able to detect periodic Doppler shifts in the spectrum of the star. There are some hints that such effects may already have been observed.

=== Neutron to mirror-neutron oscillations ===
Neutrons, which are electrically neutral particles of ordinary matter, could oscillate into its mirror partner, the mirror neutron. Recent experiments looked for neutrons vanishing into the mirror world. Most experiments found no signal and hence gave limits on transition rates to the mirror state; one paper claimed signals. Current research looks for signals where an applied magnetic field adjust the energy level of the neutron to the mirror world. This energy difference can be interpreted due to a mirror magnetic field present in the mirror world or a mass difference of the neutron and its mirror partner. Such a transition to the mirror world could also solve the neutron lifetime puzzle.

Experiments searching for mirror neutron oscillation are ongoing at the Paul Scherrer Institute's UCN source in Switzerland, Institut Laue-Langevin in France, and via the Spallation Neutron Source at the Oak Ridge National Laboratory in the U.S.

== See also ==
- Antimatter – Material composed of antiparticles
- Dark energy – Energy driving the accelerated expansion of the universe
- Dark matter – Hypothetical invisible cosmic material
- Gravitational interaction of antimatter – Theory of gravity on antimatter
- Negative energy – Concept in physics
- Negative mass – Concept in physical models
- Strange matter – Degenerate matter made from strange quarks
- QCD matter – Hypothetical phases of matter
