= Cryogenic Dark Matter Search =

Physics exploration experiment

The Cryogenic Dark Matter Search (CDMS) is a series of experiments designed to directly detect particle dark matter in the form of Weakly Interacting Massive Particles (or WIMPs). Using an array of semiconductor detectors at millikelvin temperatures, CDMS has at times set the most sensitive limits on the interactions of WIMP dark matter with terrestrial materials (as of 2018, CDMS limits are not the most sensitive). The first experiment, CDMS I, was run in a tunnel under Stanford University. It was followed by CDMS II experiment in the Soudan Mine. Next, SuperCDMS (or SuperCDMS Soudan), was located deep underground in the Soudan Mine in northern Minnesota and collected data from 2011 through 2015. The series of experiments continues with SuperCDMS SNOLAB, an experiment located at the SNOLAB facility near Sudbury, Ontario, in Canada that started construction in 2018 and began taking science data in August 2026.

== Background ==
Observations of the large-scale structure of the universe show that matter is aggregated into very large structures that have not had time to form under the force of their own self-gravitation. It is generally believed that some form of missing mass is responsible for increasing the gravitational force at these scales, although this mass has not been directly observed. This is a problem; normal matter in space will heat up until it gives off light, so if this missing mass exists, it is generally assumed to be in a form that is not commonly observed on earth.

A number of proposed candidates for the missing mass have been put forward over time. Early candidates included heavy baryons that would have had to be created in the Big Bang, but more recent work on nucleosynthesis seems to have ruled most of these out. Another candidate are new types of particles known as weakly interacting massive particles, or "WIMP"s. As the name implies, WIMPs interact weakly with normal matter, which explains why they are not easily visible.

Detecting WIMPs thus presents a problem; if the WIMPs are very weakly interacting, detecting them will be extremely difficult. Detectors like CDMS and similar experiments measure huge numbers of interactions within their detector volume in order to find the extremely rare WIMP events.

== Detection technology ==
The CDMS detectors measure the ionization and phonons produced by every particle interaction in their germanium and silicon crystal substrates. These two measurements determine the energy deposited in the crystal in each interaction, but also give information about what kind of particle caused the event. The ratio of ionization signal to phonon signal differs for particle interactions with atomic electrons ("electron recoils") and atomic nuclei ("nuclear recoils"). The vast majority of background particle interactions are electron recoils, while WIMPs (and neutrons) are expected to produce nuclear recoils. This allows WIMP-scattering events to be identified even though they are rare compared to the vast majority of unwanted background interactions.

From supersymmetry, the probability of a spin-independent interaction between a WIMP and a nucleus would be related to the number of nucleons in the nucleus. Thus, a WIMP would be more likely to interact with a germanium detector than a silicon detector, since germanium is a much heavier element. Neutrons would be able to interact with both silicon and germanium detectors with similar probability. By comparing rates of interactions between silicon and germanium detectors, CDMS is able to determine the probability of interactions being caused by neutrons.

CDMS detectors are disks of germanium or silicon, cooled to millikelvin temperatures by a dilution refrigerator. The extremely low temperatures are needed to limit thermal noise which would otherwise obscure the phonon signals of particle interactions. Phonon detection is accomplished with superconduction transition edge sensors (TESs) read out by SQUID amplifiers, while ionization signals are read out using a FET amplifier. CDMS detectors also provide data on the phonon pulse shape which is crucial in rejecting near-surface background events.

== History ==
Bolometric detection of neutrinos with semiconductors at low temperature was first proposed by Blas Cabrera, Lawrence M. Krauss, and Frank Wilczek, and a similar method was proposed for WIMP detection by Mark Goodman and Edward Witten.

CDMS I collected WIMP search data in a shallow underground site (called SUF, Stanford Underground Facility) at Stanford University during 1998–2002. CDMS II operated (with collaboration from the University of Minnesota) in the Soudan Mine from 2003 to 2009 (data taking 2006–2008). The SuperCDMS (or SuperCDMS Soudan) experiment, with interleaved electrodes, more mass, and even better background rejection was taking data at Soudan during 2011–2015. The series of experiments continues with SuperCDMS SNOLAB, with construction in SNOLAB due to be completed in 2026.

The series of experiments also includes the CDMSlite experiment which used SuperCDMS detectors at Soudan in an operating mode (called CDMSlite-mode) that was meant to be sensitive specifically to low-mass WIMPs. As the CDMS-experiment has multiple different detector technologies in use, in particular, 2 types of detectors based on germanium or silicon, respectively, the experiments derived from some specific configuration of the CDMS-experiment detectors and different data-sets thus collected are sometimes given names like CDMS Ge, CDMS Si, CDMS II Si et cetera.

=== Results ===
On December 17, 2009, the collaboration announced the possible detection of two candidate WIMPs, one on August 8, 2007, and the other on October 27, 2007. Due to the low number of events, the team could exclude false positives from background noise such as neutron collisions. It is estimated that such noise would produce two or more events 25% of the time. Polythene absorbers were fitted to reduce any neutron background.

A 2011 analysis with lower energy thresholds, looked for evidence for low-mass WIMPs (M < 9 GeV). Their limits rule out hints claimed by a new germanium experiment called CoGeNT and the long-standing DAMA/NaI, DAMA/LIBRA annual modulation result.

Further analysis of data in Physical Review Letters May 2013, revealed 3 WIMP detections with an expected background of 0.7, with masses expected from WIMPs, including neutralinos. There is a 0.19% chance that these are anomalous background noise, giving the result a 99.8% (3 sigmas) confidence level. Whilst not conclusive evidence for WIMPs this provides strong weight to the theories. This signal was observed by the CDMS II-experiment and it is called the CDMS Si-signal (sometimes the experiment is also called CDMS Si) because it was observed by the silicon detectors.

SuperCDMS search results from October 2012 to June 2013 were published in June 2014, finding 11 events in the signal region for WIMP mass less than 30 GeV, and set an upper limit for spin-independent cross section disfavoring a recent CoGeNT low mass signal.

== SuperCDMS SNOLAB ==
A second generation of SuperCDMS is installed at SNOLAB. This is expanded from SuperCDMS Soudan in several ways:

- The individual silicon and germanium detector discs are 100 mm/3.9″ diameter × 33.3 mm/1.3″ thick, 225% of the volume of the 76.2 mm/3″ diameter × 25.4 mm/1″ thick discs in Soudan.
- The SuperCDMS SNOLAB cryostat has room for 7 "towers" of six detector discs each, with 4 such detector towers currently installed,
- The detector is better shielded, by both its deeper location in SNOLAB, and greater attention to radiopurity in construction.
- There are silicon and germanium detectors. Silicon is sensitive to lower WIMP masses, while germanium has a lower cross-section threshold for detection.

25% of the detectors are made of silicon, which only weighs 44% as much as germanium. Although the construction project suffered some delays (earlier plans hoped for construction to begin in 2014 and 2016), it remained active, with space allocated in SNOLAB and a scheduled construction start in early 2018.

The construction of SuperCDMS at SNOLAB started in 2018 with expected beginning of operations in early 2020s. The construction project budget at the time was US$34 million.

In May 2021, the SuperCDMS experiment was under construction at SNOLAB, with preliminary studies with prototype/testing hardware planned both at SNOLAB and at other locations. The full detector was expected to be ready for science data taking at the end of 2023, and the science operations to last 3 years (with two separate runs) 2023-2027, with possible extensions and developments beyond 2027.

In May 2022, SuperCDMS SNOLAB experiment installation was in progress, with a plan to start commissioning in 2023. First science run with full detector payload in early 2024 and first result in early 2025. In June 2023, SuperCDMS SNOLAB installation was in full swing.

Commissioning of the installed experiment started in early 2026.

Science data taking started in August 2026.

== GEODM proposal ==
A third generation of SuperCDMS is envisioned, although still in the early planning phase. GEODM (GErmanium Observatory for Dark Matter), with roughly 1500 kg of detector mass, has expressed interest in the SNOLAB "Cryopit" location.

Increasing the detector mass only makes the detector more sensitive if the unwanted background detections do not increase as well, thus each generation must be cleaner and better shielded than the one before. The purpose of building in ten-fold stages like this is to develop the necessary shielding techniques before finalizing the GEODM design.
