= Deduction and induction =

Deduction and induction may refer to:

- Deductive reasoning
- Inductive reasoning
- Validity (logic)
- Cogency (disambiguation)
