= Cogent =

Cogent or cogency may refer to:

- A characteristic of a well-reasoned or persuasive argument
- CoGeNT, a type of detector for weakly interacting massive particles
- Cogent Communications, an Internet service provider
- Cogent Inc., a provider of automated fingerprint identification systems
- A group of Open Access journals operated by Taylor and Francis
