= Canfranc Underground Laboratory =

Scientific facility in Canfranc, Spain

Coordinates: 42.749374°N 0.516330°W

Canfranc Underground Laboratory - LSC
- Established: 2006
- Research type: Low-background physics
- Location: Canfranc, Aragón (Spain)
- Operating agency: University of Zaragoza
- Website: www.lsc-canfranc.es

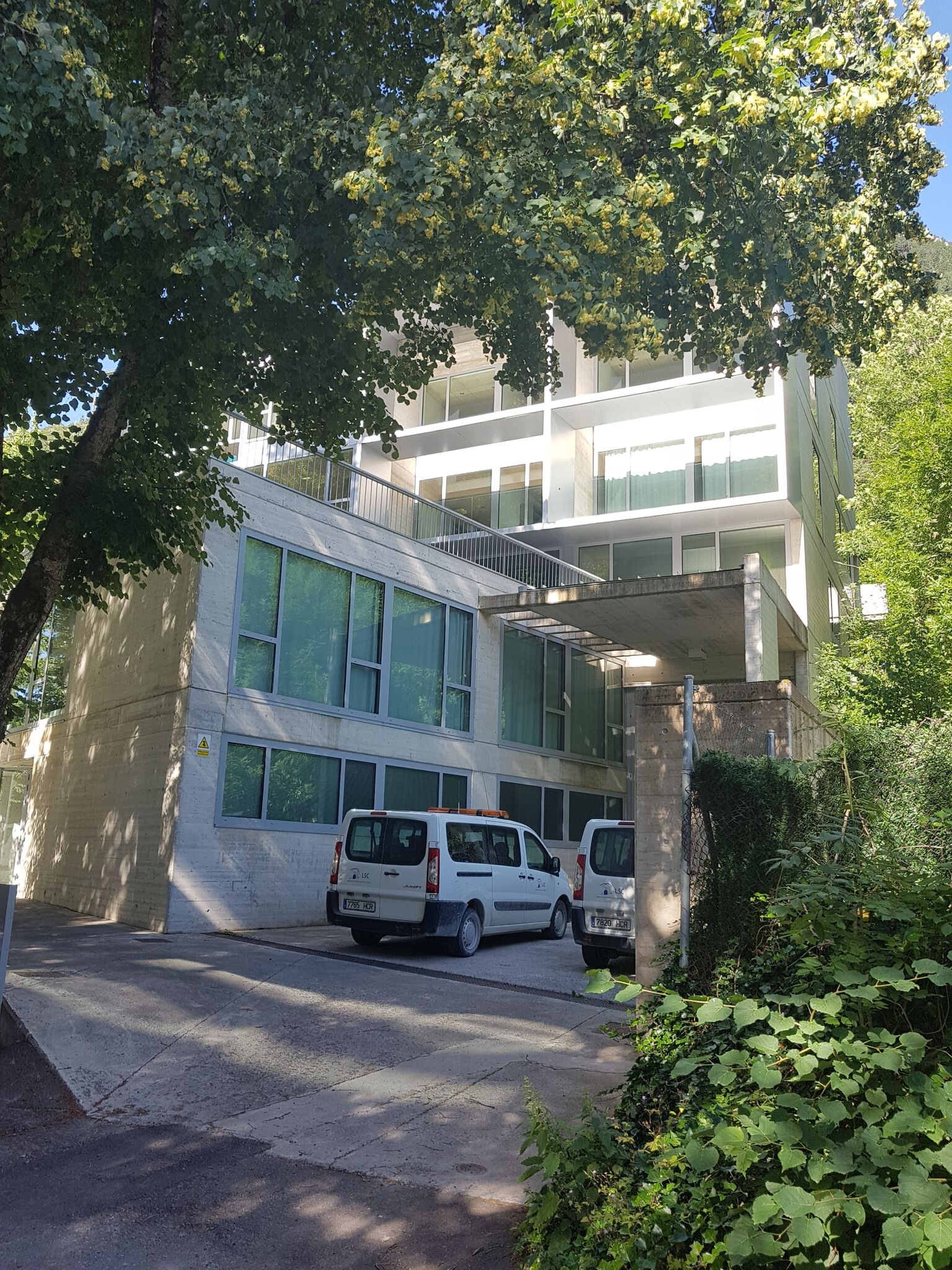
Entrance of the offices

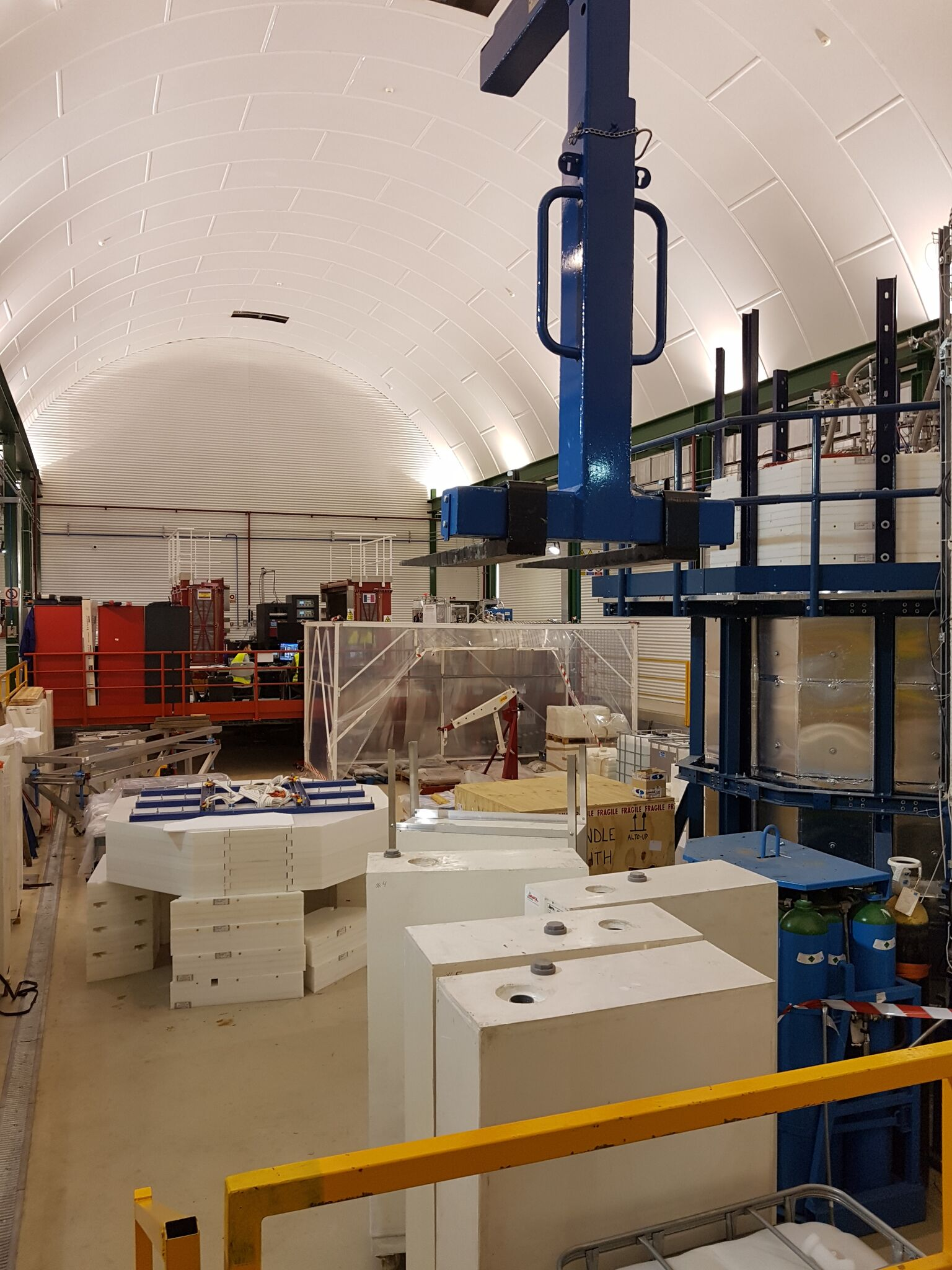
Main lab interior, between Somport road tunnel and the old Canfranc railway tunnel

The Canfranc Underground Laboratory (Spanish: Laboratorio Subterráneo de Canfranc or LSC) is an underground scientific facility located in the former railway tunnel of Somport under Monte Tobazo (Pyrenees) in Canfranc. The laboratory, 780 m deep and protected from cosmic radiation, is mainly devoted to study rarely occurring natural phenomena such as the interactions of neutrinos of cosmic origin or dark matter with atomic nuclei.

Access to the tunnel containing the laboratory is at the Estación Internacional de Canfranc, a former international railway station in the village of Canfranc.

== Experiments ==
As of 2023, the following experiments are ongoing in Canfranc:

- ANAIS, WIMP dark matter search experiment
- DArT, experiment to measure the radioactive activation of argon
- TREX-DM, WIMP dark matter search experiment
- NEXT, neutrinoless double beta decay experiment
- CROSS, Cryogenic Rare-event Observatory with Surface Sensitivity, searching for neutrinoless double beta decay
- SuperKGd (also known as SUPERK-GD or under similar names), experiment for mapping of background noise signal for the Super-Kamiokande neutrino telescope in Japan. There is a plan to operate the Super-Kamiokande detector with Gadolinium salt dissolved into the water-mass of the detector. This operation would introduce unknown backgrounds in the neutrino-detection process of Super-Kamiokande, and SuperK-Gd is mapping those backgrounds.
- BabyIAXO, preparing the ground for the full infrastructure of the IAXO (International Axion Observatory) which is a new generation axion helioscope and its main goal is to detect axions (or other similar particles) potentially emitted by the Sun’s core in large quantities
- GOLLUM, underground biology experiment

As of 2023, the following experiments were described as proposals:

- Multicellular structure formation in response to low level background radiation, a biology experiment
- Microorganisms with enhanced DNA damage repair abilities, a biology experiment
- Interaction between host and pathogens under low-radiation background, a biology experiment
- THE MODERN-E PROJECT, a study of wireless transmission of geotechnical data through clay rocks. Through its works, it aims to achieve a wireless monitoring system capable of operating with the measurement instrumentation commonly used for monitoring the main geotechnical parameters that are relevant for the operation of the future nuclear waste repository
- CADEX, the Canfranc Axion Detection Experiment
- Luria-Delbrück 2.0, studying cosmic radiation to evaluate its possible role in the mutation rate of bacteria
- Bacteria in heavy water, a biology experiment
- NEXT-HD, the fourth phase of the NEXT program
- NaI-CGF, this proposal aims to build and commission an underground facility to grow ultra-high radiopurity NaI(Tl) scintillators
- HENSA, High Efficiency Neutron-Spectrometry Array
- ARQ-Qubits, aims at developing a new technology to mitigate the effects of radiation on qubits
- DAMIC, Dark Matter in CCDs, a dark matter detection experiment
- LU, Low-level γ spectroscopy with High Purity Germanium (HPGe) detectors, a radiopurity experiment
- CUNA, an underground nuclear astrophysics facility

As of 2023, the following experiments have completed their activities in Canfranc:

- ArDM, WIMP dark matter search experiment
- ETSEC, preliminary study for the Einstein Telescope project
- BiPo, radio-purity of materials experiment
- ROSEBUD, dark matter experiment
- LAGUNA, neutrino observatory study (just a study, no real experiment hardware built and no measurements of any sort took place)
- GOLLUM, underground biology experiment
