= ArDM =

Physics experiment to detect dark matter

The ArDM (Argon Dark Matter) Experiment was a particle physics experiment based on a liquid argon detector, aiming at measuring signals from WIMPs (Weakly Interacting Massive Particles), which may constitute the Dark Matter in the universe. Elastic scattering of WIMPs from argon nuclei is measurable by observing free electrons from ionization and photons from scintillation, which are produced by the recoiling nucleus interacting with neighbouring atoms. The ionization and scintillation signals can be measured with dedicated readout techniques, which constituted a fundamental part of the detector.

In order to get a high enough target mass the noble gas argon was used in the liquid phase as target material. Since the boiling point of argon is at 87 K at normal pressure, the operation of the detector required a cryogenic system.

The ArDM experiment ended in 2019 when data taking was stopped and the experiment's apparatus decommissioned. The ArDM experiment's apparatus was then reused for another physics experiment, DArT (part of the DarkSide program), at Canfranc Underground Laboratory.

ArDM did not find signals of dark matter particles.

== Detecting WIMPs with argon ==
The ArDM detector aimed at directly detecting signals from WIMPs via elastic scattering from argon nuclei. During the scattering, a certain recoil energy - typically lying between 1 keV and 100 keV - is supposedly transferred from the WIMP to the argon nucleus.

It is not known how frequently a signal from WIMP-argon interaction can be expected (if at all). This rate depends on the properties of the WIMP. One of the most popular candidates for a WIMP is the Lightest Supersymmetric Particle (LSP) or neutralino from supersymmetric theories. Its cross section with nucleons presumably lies between 10^{−12} pb and 10^{−6} pb, making WIMP-nucleon interactions a rare event. The total event rate can be increased by optimizing the target properties, such as increasing the target mass. The ArDM detector was planned to contain approximately one ton of liquid argon. This target mass corresponded to an event rate of approximately 100 events per day at a cross section of 10^{−6} pb or 0.01 events per day at 10^{−10} pb.

Small event rates require a powerful background rejection. An important background for argon based detectors comes from the presence of the unstable ^{39}Ar isotope in natural argon liquefied from the atmosphere. ^{39}Ar undergoes beta decay with a halflife of 269 years and an endpoint of the beta spectrum at 565 keV. The ratio of ionization over scintillation from electron and gamma interactions is different than WIMP scattering should produce. The ^{39}Ar background is therefore well distinguishable, with a precise determination of the ionization/scintillation ratio. As an alternative, the use of depleted argon from underground wells has been considered.

Neutrons emitted by detector components and by materials surrounding the detector interact with argon in the same way as the putative WIMPs. The neutron background is therefore nearly indistinguishable and has to be reduced as well as possible, as for example by carefully choosing the detector materials. Furthermore, an estimation or measurement of the remaining neutron flux is necessary.

The detector was run underground in order to avoid backgrounds induced by cosmic rays.

== History ==
The ArDM detector was assembled and tested at CERN in 2006. Above ground studies of the equipment and detector performance were performed before it was moved underground in 2012 in the Canfranc Underground Laboratory in Spain. It was commissioned and tested at room temperature. During the April 2013 run underground, the light yield was improved compared to surface conditions. Cold argon gas runs were planned as well as continued detector development. Liquid argon results were planned for 2014.

Beyond the one-ton version, the detector size can be increased without fundamentally changing its technology. A ten-ton liquid argon detector was considered as an expansion possibility for ArDM. Experiments for Dark Matter detection at a mass scale of 1 kg to 100 kg with negative results demonstrated the necessity of ton-scale experiments.

== Future Directions ==
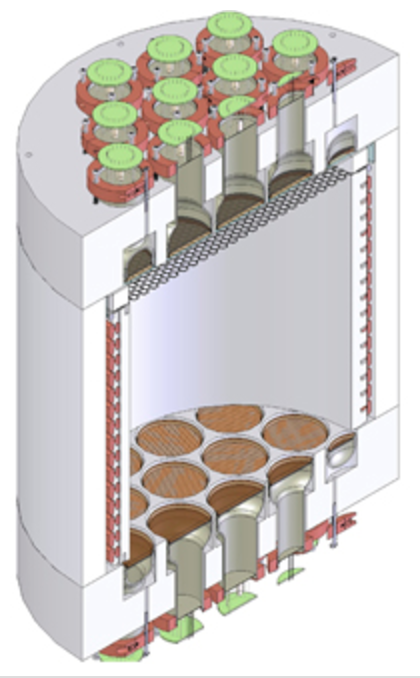
Design of DarkSide-50 liquid argon dewar containing the two-phase TPC.

Despite studying inherently 'dark' matter, the future seems bright for dark matter detector development. The "Dark Side Program", of which ArDM was a member, is a consortium that has conducted and continues to develop new experiments based on condensed atmospheric argon (LAr), instead of xenon, liquid. One recent Dark Side apparatus, the Dark Side-50 (DS-50), employs a method known as "two-phase liquid argon time projection chambers (LAr TPCs)," which allows for three-dimensional determination of collision event positions created by the electroluminescence created by argon collisions with dark matter particles. The Dark Side program released its first results on its findings in 2015, so far being the most sensitive results for argon-based dark matter detection. LAr-based methods used for future apparatuses present an alternative to xenon-based detectors and could potentially lead to new, more sensitive multi-ton detectors in the near future.
