= DAMA/NaI =

The DAMA/NaI experiment investigated the presence of dark matter particles in the galactic halo by exploiting the model-independent annual modulation signature. Based on the Earth's orbit around the Sun and the Solar System's speed with respect to the center of the galaxy (which on short time scales can be considered constant), the Earth should be exposed to a higher flux of dark matter particles around June 1, when its orbital speed is added to that of the Solar System with respect to the galaxy and to a smaller one around December 2, when the two velocities are subtracted. The annual modulation signature is distinctive since the effect induced by dark matter particles must simultaneously satisfy many requirements.

== Description ==
The experimental set-up was located deep underground in the Laboratori Nazionali del Gran Sasso in Italy.

The experimental set-up was made by nine 9.70 kg low-radioactivity scintillating thallium-doped sodium iodide crystals [NaI(Tl)]. Each crystal was faced by two low-background photomultipliers through 10 cm light guides. The detectors were installed inside a sealed copper box flushed with highly pure nitrogen in order to insulate the detectors from air that contains trace amounts of radon, a radioactive gas. To reduce radiation from radon daughters and other environmental effects, the copper box is enclosed inside a multi-component, multi-ton passive shield made of copper, lead, polyethylene/paraffin, and cadmium foil. A plexiglass box encloses the whole shield and is also kept in a highly pure nitrogen atmosphere. A concrete neutron moderator 1 m thick largely surrounds the set-up. The experiment followed the proposal of Pierluigi Belli (then a Ph.D. student, now a research director of the Italian National Institute of Nuclear Physics), which his research group then followed up on.

== Results ==
The DAMA/NaI set-up observed the annual modulation signature over 7 annual cycles (1995–2002). The presence of a model independent positive evidence in the data of DAMA/NaI was first reported by the DAMA collaboration in fall 1997 and published beginning of 1998. The final paper with the full results was published in 2003 after the end of experiment in July 2002. Various corollary investigations are continuing and have also been published.

The model-independent evidence is compatible with a wide set of scenarios regarding the nature of the dark matter candidate and related astrophysical, nuclear and particle physics, for example: neutralinos, inelastic dark matter, self-interacting dark matter, and heavy 4th generation neutrinos.

A careful quantitative investigation of possible sources of systematic and side reactions has been regularly carried out and published at the time of each data release. No systematic effect or side reaction able to account for the observed modulation amplitude and to simultaneously satisfy all the requirements of the signature has been found.

The experiment has also obtained and published many results on other processes and approaches.

== Skepticism ==
Negative results from the XENON Dark Matter Search Experiment seem to contradict DAMA/Nal's results.

The COSINE-100 collaboration has been working in Korea towards confirming or refuting the DAMA-signal. They are using a similar experimental setup to DAMA (NaI(Tl)-crystals). They published their results in December 2018 in the journal Nature; their conclusion was that their "result rules out WIMP–nucleon interactions as the cause of the annual modulation observed by the DAMA collaboration".

A possible explanation of the reported modulation was pointed out as originating from the data analysis procedure. A yearly subtraction of the constant component can give rise to a sawtooth residual in the presence of a slower time dependence. New support for this hypothesis came in August 2022 when COSINE-100 applied an analysis method similar to one used by DAMA/LIBRA and found a similar annual modulation suggesting the signal could be just a statistical artifact.

In May 2021, the ANAIS dark matter direct detection experiment, after acquiring data for 3 years at the Canfranc Underground Laboratory in Spain, has not seen evidence for annual modulation in 112.5 kg of NaI(Tl) crystals and is thus incompatible with DAMA/NaI and DAMA/LIBRA and in November new results from COSINE-100 experiment after 1.7 years of data collection also failed to replicate the signal of DAMA.

== Follow-up ==
DAMA/NaI has been replaced by the new generation experiment, DAMA/LIBRA. These experiments are carried out by Italian and Chinese researchers.
