= CoGeNT =

Experiment searching for dark matter

The CoGeNT experiment has searched for dark matter. It uses a single germanium crystal (~100 grams) as a cryogenic detector for WIMP particles. CoGeNT has operated in the Soudan Underground Laboratory since 2009.

== Results ==
Their first announcement was an excess of events recorded after 56 days. Juan Collar, who presented the results to a conference at the University of California, was quoted: "If it's real, we're looking at a very beautiful dark-matter signal".

This signal conflicts with other searches that have failed to find any evidence, such as XENON and LUX but appears to confirm results from DAMA.

They observed an annual modulation in the event rate that could indicate light dark matter.

The annual modulation has continued to be seen in 3 years of data.

However more recent work has shown that the excess of events attributed to a tentative dark matter signal was in fact due to an underestimated background from surface events. After accounting for this background there is no evidence for a signal in data from the CoGeNT experiment and no tension with null results from other experiments.
