= ANAIS-112 =

Spanish dark matter direct detection experiment

ANAIS-112 experiment
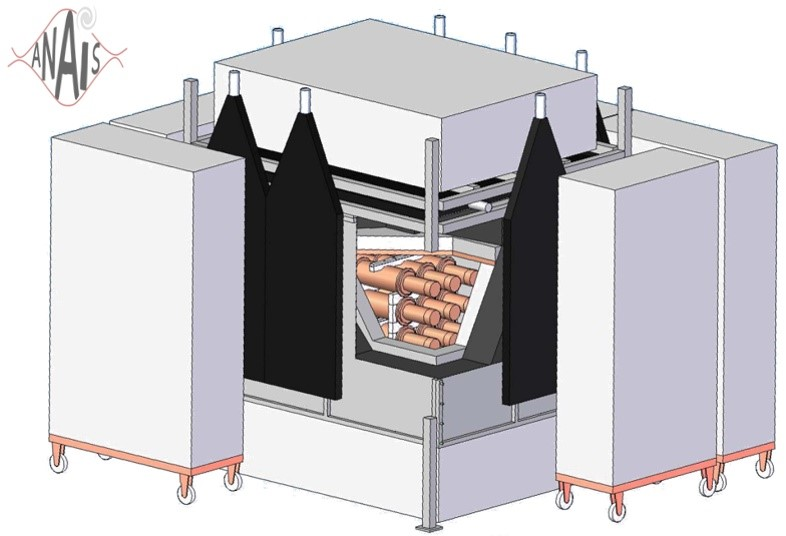
- Legal status: Taking data since 03-08-2017
- Purpose: Testing the positive annual modulation signal reported by DAMA/LIBRA
- Headquarters: Canfranc Underground Laboratory, Spain
- Fields: Dark Matter search, Astroparticle Physics
- Website: https://gifna.unizar.es/anais/

ANAIS (Annual modulation with NaI Scintillators) is a dark matter direct detection experiment located at the Canfranc Underground Laboratory (LSC), in Spain, operated by a team of researchers of the CAPA at the University of Zaragoza.

ANAIS' goal is to confirm or refute in a model independent way the DAMA/LIBRA experiment positive result: an annual modulation in the low-energy detection rate having all the features expected for the signal induced by weakly interacting dark matter particles (WIMPs) in a standard galactic halo. This modulation is produced as a result of the Earth rotation around the Sun. A modulation with all the characteristic of a Dark Matter (DM) signal has been observed for about 20 years by DAMA/LIBRA, but it is in strong tension with the negative results of other DM direct detection experiments. Compatibility among the different experimental results in most conventional WIMP-DM scenarios is actually disfavored, but it is strongly dependent on the DM particle and halo models considered. A comparison using the same target material, NaI(Tl), is more direct and almost model-independent.

== Experimental set up and performance ==
ANAIS-112 experimental setup consists of 112.5 kg of NaI(Tl), distributed in 9 cylindrical modules, 12.5 kg each and built by Alpha Spectra Inc., arranged in a 3 × 3 configuration.

Among the most relevant features of ANAIS- 112 modules, it is worth highlighting its remarkable optical quality, which combined to using high quantum efficiency Hamamatsu photomultipliers (PMTs) results in a very high light collection, at the level of 15 photoelectrons (phe) per keV in all the nine modules. The signals from the two PMTs coupled to each module are digitized at 2 GS/s in a 1.2 μs window with high resolution (14 bits). The trigger requires the coincidence of the two PMT trigger signals in a 200 ns window, while the PMT individual trigger is set at the single phe level.

Another interesting feature is a Mylar window in the middle of one of the lateral faces of the detectors, which allows to calibrate simultaneously the nine modules with external x-ray/gamma sources down to 10 keV in a radon-free environment. A careful low energy calibration of the region of interest (ROI), from 1 to 6 keV, is carried out by combining information from external calibrations and background. External calibrations with a ^{109}Cd source are performed every two weeks, and every 1.5 months energy depositions at 3.2 and 0.87 keV from ^{40}K and ^{22}Na internal contaminations in one ANAIS module are selected by profiting from the coincidence with a high energy gamma in a second module.

The ANAIS-112 experiment is installed inside a shielding consisting of an inner layer of 10 cm of archaeological lead and an outer layer of 20 cm of low activity lead. This lead shielding is encased into an anti-radon box, tightly closed and kept under overpressure with radon-free nitrogen gas. The external layer of the shielding (the neutron shielding) consists of 40 cm of a combination of water tanks and polyethylene bricks. An active veto made up of 16 plastic scintillators is placed between the anti-radon box and the neutron shielding, covering the top and sides of the set-up allowing to effectively tag the residual muon flux onsite along the ANAIS-112 data taking. ANAIS-112 was commissioned during the spring of 2017 and it started the data-taking phase at the hall B of the LSC on 3 August 2017 under 2450 m.w.e. rock overburden. The "live time" of the experiment, useful for analysis, is more than 95%, allowing for the high duty cycle achieved. Down time is mostly due to the periodical calibration of the modules.

Setting up ANAIS-112 at LSC.

A background understanding has been achieved, except in the [1-2] keV energy region, where the background model underestimates the measured event rate. Crystal bulk contamination is the dominant background source, being ^{210}Pb, ^{40}K, ^{22}Na, ^{3}H contributions the most relevant ones in the region of interest. Considering altogether the nine ANAIS-112 modules, the average background in the ROI is 3.6 cpd/kg/keV after three years of data taking, while DAMA/LIBRAphase2 background is below 0.80 cpd/kg/keV in the[1–2] keV energy interval, below 0.24 cpd/kg/keV in the [2–3] keV energy interval, and below 0.12 cpd/kg/keV in the [3–4] keV energy interval.

== Annual modulation analysis and results ==
The development of filtering protocols based on the pulse shape and light sharing among the two PMTs has been crucial to fulfill the ANAIS-112 goal since the trigger rate in the ROI is dominated by non-bulk scintillation events. The determination of the corresponding efficiency is very important, and it is calculated using ^{109}Cd, ^{40}K and ^{22}Na events. It is very close to 100% down to 2 keV, and then decreases steeply to about 15% at 1 keV, where the analysis threshold is set.

A blind protocol for the annual modulation analysis of ANAIS-112 data has been applied: single-hit events in the ROI are kept blinded during the event selection. Up to now, three unblindings of the data have been carried out: at 1.5 years, at 2 years, and 3 years, which correspond to exposures of 157.55, 220.69, and 313.95 kg×y, respectively. ANAIS-112 annual modulation search is performed in the same regions explored by DAMA/LIBRA collaboration, [1–6] keV and [2–6] keV, fixing the period to 1 year and the maximum of the modulation to 2 June.

To evaluate the statistical significance of a possible modulation in ANAIS–112 data, the events rate of the nine detectors is calculated in 10-days bins, and it is minimized χ^{2} = Σ_{i} (n_{i} − μ_{i})^{2}/σ^{2}_{i}, where n_{i} is the number of events in the time bin t_{i} (corrected by live time and detector efficiency), σ_{i} is the corresponding Poisson uncertainty, accordingly corrected, and μ_{i} is the expected number of events at that time bin, that depends on the background model and can be written as: μ_{i} = [R_{0}φ_{bkg}(t_{i}) + S_{m}cos(ω(t_{i} − t_{0}))]M∆E∆t.

Here, R_{0} represents the non-modulated rate in the experiment, $\phi_{bkg}$ is the probability distribution function (PDF) in time of any non-modulated component, S_{m} is the modulation amplitude, ω is fixed to 2π/365 d = 0.01721 rad d^{−1}, t_{0} to −62.2 d (time origin has been taken on 3 August and then the cosine maximum is on 2 June), M is the total detector mass, ∆E is the energy interval width, and ∆t the time bin width. R_{0} is a free parameter, while S_{m} is either fixed to 0 (for the null hypothesis) or left unconstrained, positive or negative (for the modulation hypothesis).

The null hypothesis is well supported for the 3-years data in both energy regions, being the results for the two background models (a single exponential or a PDF based on the Monte Carlo background model) compatible. The standard deviation σ(S_{m}) is slightly lower when detectors are considered independently, as expected following a priori sensitivity analysis. Therefore, this fit is chosen to quote the ANAIS-112 annual modulation final result and sensitivity for three-year exposure. The best fits are incompatible with the DAMA/LIBRA result at 3.3 and 2.6 σ in [1-6] and [2-6] keV energy regions, for a sensitivity of 2.5 (2.7)σ at [1–6] keV ([2–6] keV). ANAIS-112 results for 1.5, 2 and 3 years of data-taking fully confirm the sensitivity projection.

Results of an annual modulation in the three years of ANAIS-112 data. DAMA/LIBRA and COSINE-100 results are also shown.
S_{m} (cpd/kg/keV)
Energy region	ANAIS-112	DAMA/LIBRA	COSINE-100
[1-6] keV	-0.0034 ± 0.0042	0.0105 ± 0.0011	-
[2-6] keV	0.0003 ± 0.0037	0.0102 ± 0.0008	0.0092 ± 0.0067

ANAIS-112 results support the prospects of reaching a sensitivity above 3σ in 2022, within the scheduled 5 years of data taking.

Several consistency checks have been carried out (changing the number of detectors entering into the fit, considering only the first two years or the last two years, or changing the time bin size), concluding that there is no hint supporting relevant systematical uncertainties in the result. The performance of a large set of Monte Carlo pseudo-experiments sampled from the background model guarantees that the fit is not biased. A frequency analysis have also been conducted, and the conclusion is that there is no statistically significant modulation in the frequency range searched in the ANAIS-112 data.

== Future prospects ==
ANAIS-112 sensitivity limitation is mostly due to the high background in the ROI, but in particular in the region from 1 to 2 keV. In this context, the application of machine learning techniques based on Boosted Decision Trees (BDTs), under development at present, could improve the rejection of these non-bulk scintillation events. Preliminary results point to a relevant sensitivity improvement. Extending the data taking for a few more years, could allow testing DAMA/LIBRA at the 5σ level. Operation at Canfranc Underground Laboratory has been granted until the end of 2025.

One possible systematics affecting the comparison between DAMA/LIBRA and ANAIS result is a possible different detector response to nuclear recoils, because both experiments are calibrated using x-rays/gammas. It is well known that scintillation is strongly quenched for energy deposited by nuclear recoils with respect to the same energy deposited by electrons. Measurements of Quenching Factors (QF) in NaI scintillators are affected by strong discrepancies. ANAIS-112 detectors QF are being determined after measurements at TUNL. In addition, a complete calibration program for the experiment using neutron sources onsite is being developed.

ANAIS-112 published results are available in open access at the webpage of the Dark Matter Data Center: https://www.origins-cluster.de/odsl/dark-matter-data-center/available-datasets/anais

Data are available upon request.

== Funding Agencies ==
ANAIS experiment operation is presently financially supported by MICIU/AEI/10.13039/501100011033 (Grants No. PID2022-138357NB-C21 and PID2019-104374GB-I00), and Unión Europea NextGenerationEU/PRTR (AstroHEP) and the Gobierno de Aragón. Funding from Grant FPA2017-83133-P, Consolider-Ingenio 2010 Programme under grants MULTIDARK CSD2009-00064 and CPAN CSD2007-00042, the Gobierno de Aragón and the LSC Consortium made possible the setting-up of the detectors. The technical support from LSC and GIFNA staff as well as from Servicios de Apoyo a la Investigación de la Universidad de Zaragoza (SAIs) is warmly acknowledged.
