= DAMA/LIBRA =

Particle detector experiment

The DAMA/LIBRA experiment is a particle detector experiment designed to detect dark matter using the direct detection approach, by using a matrix of NaI(Tl) scintillation detectors to detect dark matter particles in the galactic halo. The experiment aims to find an annual modulation of the number of detection events, caused by the variation of the velocity of the detector relative to the dark matter halo as the Earth orbits the Sun. It is located underground at the Laboratori Nazionali del Gran Sasso (LNGS) in Italy.

It is a follow-on to the DAMA/NaI experiment which observed an annual modulation signature over 7 annual cycles (1995–2002). The experiment was first proposed by Dr. Pierluigi Belli, who is now the research director of the Italian National Institute of Nuclear Physics.

While DAMA/LIBRA has published exciting results, the validity of those results has been widely disputed; they have not made their data or practices publicly available, and their methods of background noise reduction is such that it may actually account for a large part of their proposed signal annual modulation. Two other studies, attempting to replicate the DAMA/LIBRA experiment (adhering to current publication and data availability practices) using the same method – COSINE-100 and ANAIS-112 – have shown no evidence of annual modulation.

In 2020, a possible explanation of the reported modulation was pointed out as originating from the data analysis procedure. A yearly subtraction of the constant component can give rise to a sawtooth residual in the presence of a slower time dependence.

== Detector ==
The detector is made of 25 highly radiopure scintillating thallium-doped sodium iodide (NaI(Tl)) crystals placed in a 5-by-5 matrix. Each crystal is coupled to two low background photomultipliers. The detectors are placed inside a sealed copper box flushed with highly pure nitrogen; to reduce the natural environmental background the copper box is surrounded by a low background multi-ton shield. In addition, 1 m of concrete, made from the Gran Sasso rock material, almost fully surrounds this passive shield. The installation has a 3-level sealing system which prevents environmental air reaching the detectors. The whole installation is air-conditioned and several operative parameters are continuously monitored and recorded.

DAMA/LIBRA was upgraded in 2008 and in 2010. In particular, after the upgrade in 2010 the experiment entered in its phase 2, with an increase of the set-up's sensitivity thanks to the lowering of the energy threshold. The DAMA/LIBRA-phase 2 is in data taking as of 2022.

== Operation and results ==
DAMA/LIBRA phase 1 data collection started in September 2003. The DAMA/LIBRA released data correspond to 7 annual cycles. Considering these data together with those by DAMA/NaI, a total exposure (1.33 ton × yr) has been collected over 14 annual cycles. This experiment has further confirmed the presence of a model-independent annual modulation effect in the data in 2-6 keV range that satisfy all the features expected for a dark matter signal with high statistical significance.

As previously done for DAMA/NaI, careful investigations on absence of any significant systematics or side reaction in DAMA/LIBRA have been quantitatively carried out.

The obtained model independent evidence is compatible with a wide set of scenarios regarding the nature of the dark matter candidate and related astrophysical and particle physics.

As of 2021, the DAMA/LIBRA experiment is continuing.

== Failure to replicate ==
The results can be compared with the CoGeNT signal and other experiment limits to evaluate interpretations as WIMPs, neutralino, and other models. However the CoGeNT-signal has since been shown to have resulted from unaccounted background from surface effects; after accounting for this background, the CoGeNT-signal has been shown to be compatible with null results (that is, no signal at all).

The COSINE-100 collaboration has been working in Korea towards confirming or refuting the DAMA-signal. They are using similar experimental setup to DAMA (NaI(Tl)-crystals). They published their results in December 2018 in the journal Nature; their result rules out spin-independent WIMP–nucleon interactions as the cause of the annual modulation observed by the DAMA collaboration.

In May 2021, the ANAIS particle detector failed to replicate the results of the DAMA experiments after 3 years of data collection and in November new results from COSINE-100 experiment after 1.7 years of data collection also failed to replicate the signal of DAMA.

A possible explanation of the reported modulation was pointed out as originating from the data analysis procedure. A yearly subtraction of the constant component can give rise to a sawtooth residual in the presence of a slower time dependence, however later analysis shows that the data from DAMA/LIBRA is best explained by a cosine modulation over a sawtooth. New information about this hypothesis came in August 2022 when COSINE-100 applied an analysis method similar to one used by DAMA/LIBRA and found a similar annual modulation, however with "a modulation phase that is almost opposite to that observed by DAMA/LIBRA".

== SABRE ==
The obvious criticism of the seasonal variation of events recorded in the DAMA/LIBRA experiment is that it is in fact due to some purely seasonal effect unconnected with WIMPs. Although the deep underground location minimizes temperature swings and other direct sunlight effects, there are annual humidity fluctuations and other non-obvious effects. At the moment, all these criticisms are taken into account by DAMA collaboration in analysis of the experimental data and they have been excluded, as discussed in published results. A repetition of this experiment in the Southern Hemisphere with the variation in phase with DAMA/LIBRA would discount this objection; if on the other hand variation was detected in the Southern Hemisphere that was 6 months out of phase with DAMA/LIBRA, then the seasonal variation objection would be upheld.

Improved versions of DAMA/LIBRA, named SABRE (Sodium-iodide with Active Background REjection), were planned for construction in two places. One at LNGS, and the other in Australia at the Stawell Underground Physics Laboratory (SUPL), a laboratory being constructed 1025 m below the surface in a gold mine in Stawell, Victoria. First results were expected in 2017. The construction of the Stawell Underground Physics Laboratory (SUPL) was halted by the shutdown of its host mine in 2016. Construction restarted around one year later and as of October 2019 was proceeding.

The host laboratory, SUPL, was opened in August 2022. The SABRE experiment is planned to be brought underground to SUPL during the last months of 2022 and data collection is planned to start in 2023.

In October 2023, the first piece of equipment, the muon veto, was installed. In January 2024, the main muon system was installed. In April 2024, the SABRE collaboration published an executive summary providing in-depth details of the detector's design.
