= Dark matter =

Hypothetical invisible cosmic material

Unsolved problem in physics
What is dark matter? How was it generated?
More unsolved problems in physics

In astronomy and cosmology, dark matter is an invisible and hypothetical form of matter that does not interact with electromagnetic radiation, including light. Dark matter is implied by gravitational effects that cannot be explained by general relativity unless more matter is present than can be observed. Such effects occur in the context of formation and evolution of galaxies, gravitational lensing, the observable universe's current structure, mass position in galactic collisions, the motion of galaxies within galaxy clusters, and cosmic microwave background anisotropies. Dark matter is thought to serve as gravitational scaffolding for cosmic structures. After the Big Bang, dark matter clumped into blobs along narrow filaments with superclusters of galaxies forming a cosmic web at scales on which entire galaxies appear like tiny particles.

In the standard Lambda-CDM model of cosmology, the mass–energy content of the universe is 5% ordinary matter, 26.8% dark matter, and 68.2% a form of energy known as dark energy. Thus, dark matter constitutes 85% of the total mass, while dark energy and dark matter constitute 95% of the total mass–energy content. While the density of dark matter is significant in the halo around a galaxy, its local density in the Solar System is much less than normal matter. The total of all the dark matter out to the orbit of Neptune would add up to about 10^{17} kg, the same as a large asteroid. Dark matter is classified as "cold", "warm", or "hot" according to velocity (more precisely, its free streaming length). Recent models have favored a cold dark matter scenario, in which structures emerge by the gradual accumulation of particles.

Dark matter is not known to interact with ordinary baryonic matter and radiation except through gravity, making it difficult to detect in the laboratory. The most prevalent explanation is that dark matter is some as-yet-undiscovered subatomic particle, such as either weakly interacting massive particles (WIMPs) or axions. The other main possibility is that dark matter is composed of primordial black holes.

Although the astrophysics community generally accepts the existence of dark matter, a minority of astrophysicists, intrigued by specific observations that are not well explained by ordinary dark matter, argue for various modifications of the standard laws of general relativity. These include modified Newtonian dynamics (MOND), tensor–vector–scalar gravity, and entropic gravity. So far, none of the proposed modified gravity theories can describe every piece of observational evidence at the same time, suggesting that even if gravity has to be modified, some form of dark matter would still be required.

== History ==
=== 1884 to 1940 ===
The hypothesis of dark matter has an elaborate history. Lord Kelvin discussed the potential number of stars around the Sun in the appendices of a book based on a series of lectures given in 1884 in Baltimore. He inferred their density using the observed velocity dispersion of the stars near the Sun, assuming that the Sun was 20–100 million years old. He posed what would happen if there were a thousand million stars within 1 kiloparsec of the Sun (at which distance their parallax would be 1 milli-arcsecond). Kelvin concluded:

"Many of our supposed thousand million stars — perhaps a great majority of them — may be dark bodies."

In 1906, Henri Poincaré used the French term [matière obscure] ("dark matter") in discussing Kelvin's work. He concluded that the amount of dark matter would need to be less than that of visible matter, which was later found to be false.

The second person to suggest the existence of dark matter using stellar velocities was Dutch astronomer Jacobus Kapteyn in 1922. A publication from 1930 by Swedish astronomer Knut Lundmark points to him being the first to hypothesize that the universe must contain much more mass than can be observed. Dutch radio astronomy pioneer Jan Oort also hypothesized the existence of dark matter in 1932. Oort was studying stellar motions in the galactic neighborhood and found the mass in the galactic plane must be greater than what was observed, but this measurement was later determined to be incorrect.

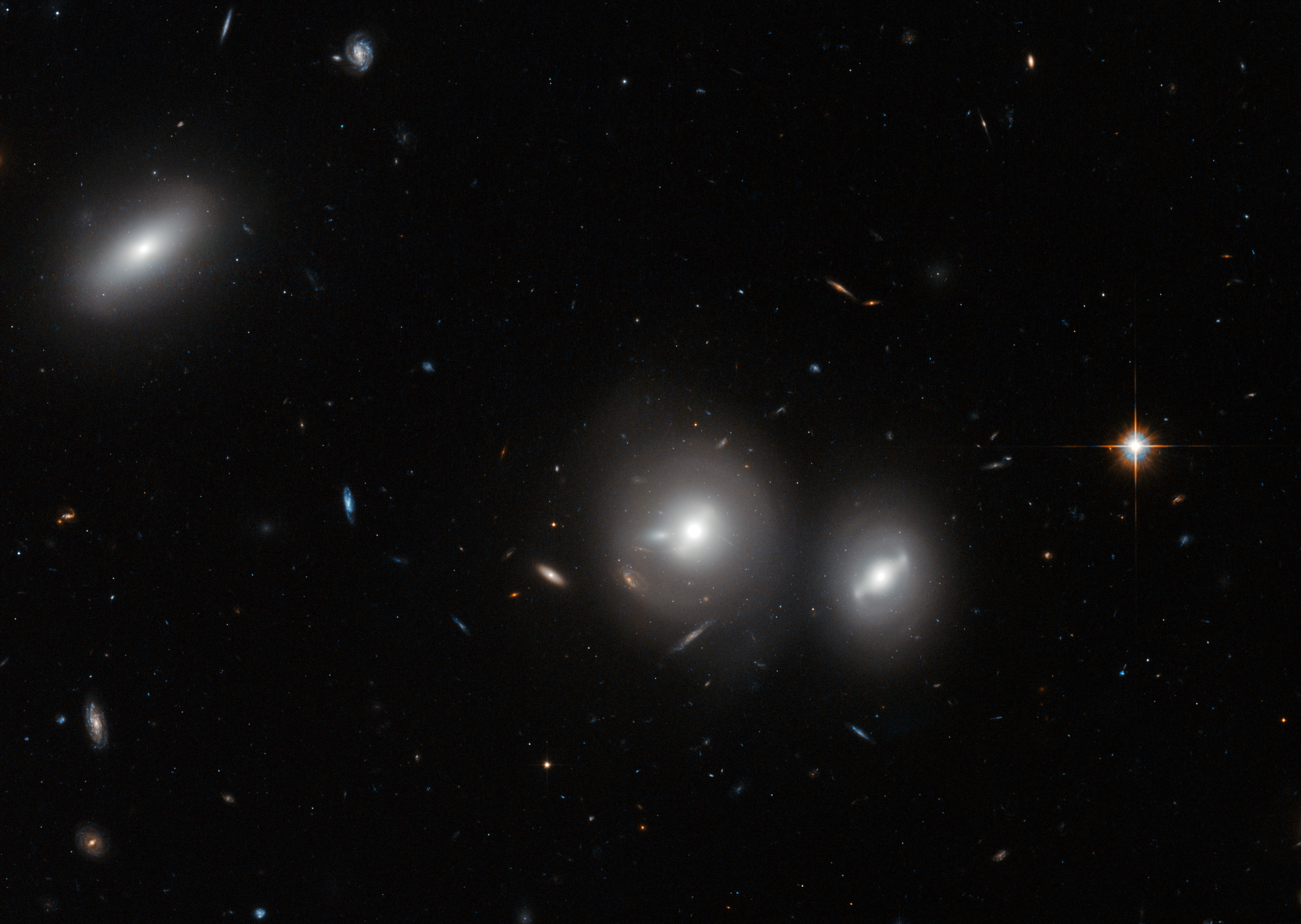
Hubble close-up on the Coma Cluster

In 1933, Swiss astrophysicist Fritz Zwicky studied galaxy clusters while working at Caltech and made a similar inference. (Note: "Um, wie beobachtet, einen mittleren Dopplereffekt von 1000 km/sek oder mehr zu erhalten, müsste also die mittlere Dichte im Comasystem mindestens 400 mal grösser sein als die auf Grund von Beobachtungen an leuchtender Materie abgeleitete. Falls sich dies bewahrheiten sollte, würde sich also das überraschende Resultat ergeben, dass dunkle Materie in sehr viel grösserer Dichte vorhanden ist als leuchtende Materie." [In order to obtain an average Doppler effect of 1000 km/s or more, as observed, the average density in the Coma system would thus have to be at least 400 times greater than that derived on the basis of observations of luminous matter. If this were to be confirmed, the surprising result would then follow that dark matter is present in very much greater density than luminous matter.]) Zwicky applied the virial theorem to the Coma Cluster and obtained evidence of unseen mass he called dunkle Materie ('dark matter'). Zwicky estimated its mass based on the motions of galaxies near its edge and compared that to an estimate based on its brightness and number of galaxies. He estimated the cluster had about 400 times more mass than was visually observable. The gravity effect of the visible galaxies was far too small for such fast orbits, thus mass must be hidden from view. Based on these conclusions, Zwicky inferred some unseen matter provided the mass and associated gravitational attraction to hold the cluster together. Zwicky's estimates were off by more than an order of magnitude, mainly due to an obsolete value of the Hubble constant; the same calculation today shows a smaller fraction, using greater values for luminous mass. Nonetheless, Zwicky did correctly conclude from his calculation that most of the gravitational matter present was dark. However, unlike modern theories, Zwicky considered "dark matter" to be non-luminous ordinary matter.

Further indications of mass-to-light ratio anomalies came from measurements of galaxy rotation curves. In 1939, H.W. Babcock reported the rotation curve for the Andromeda Galaxy (then called the Andromeda Nebula), which suggested the mass-to-luminosity ratio increases radially. He attributed it to either light absorption within the galaxy or modified dynamics in the outer portions of the spiral, rather than to unseen matter. Following Babcock's 1939 report of unexpectedly rapid rotation in the outskirts of the Andromeda Galaxy and a mass-to-light ratio of 50; in 1940, Oort discovered and wrote about the large non-visible halo of NGC 3115.

=== 1970s ===
The hypothesis of dark matter largely took root in the 1970s. Several different observations were synthesized to argue that galaxies should be surrounded by halos of unseen matter. In two papers that appeared in 1974, this conclusion was drawn in tandem by independent groups: in Princeton, New Jersey, by Jeremiah Ostriker, Jim Peebles, and Amos Yahil, and in Tartu, Estonia, by Jaan Einasto, Enn Saar, and Ants Kaasik.

Left: A simulated galaxy without dark matter. Right: Galaxy with a flat rotation curve that would be expected with dark matter.

One of the observations that served as evidence for the existence of galactic halos of dark matter was the shape of galaxy rotation curves. These observations were done in optical and radio astronomy. In optical astronomy, Vera Rubin and Kent Ford worked with a new spectrograph to measure the velocity curve of edge-on spiral galaxies with greater accuracy.

At the same time, radio astronomers were making use of new radio telescopes to map the 21 cm line of atomic hydrogen in nearby galaxies. The radial distribution of interstellar atomic hydrogen (H^{I}) often extends to much greater galactic distances than can be observed as collective starlight, expanding the sampled distances for rotation curves – and thus of the total mass distribution – to a new dynamical regime. Early mapping of the Andromeda Galaxy with the 300-foot (91 m) telescope at Green Bank and the 250-foot (76 m) dish at Jodrell Bank already showed the H^{I} rotation curve did not trace the decline expected from Keplerian orbits.

As more sensitive receivers became available, Roberts & Whitehurst (1975) were able to trace the rotational velocity of Andromeda to 30 kpc, much beyond the optical measurements. Illustrating the advantage of tracing the gas disk at large radii; that paper's Figure 16 combines the optical data (the cluster of points at radii of less than 15 kpc with a single point further out) with the H^{I} data between 20 and 30 kpc, exhibiting the flatness of the outer galaxy rotation curve; the solid curve peaking at the center is the optical surface density, while the other curve shows the cumulative mass, still rising linearly at the outermost measurement. In parallel, the use of interferometric arrays for extragalactic H^{I} spectroscopy was being developed. Rogstad & Shostak (1972) published H^{I} rotation curves of five spirals mapped with the Owens Valley interferometer; the rotation curves of all five were very flat, suggesting very large values of mass-to-light ratio in the outer parts of their extended H^{I} disks. In 1978, Albert Bosma showed further evidence of flat rotation curves using data from the Westerbork Synthesis Radio Telescope.

In 1978, Steigman et al. presented a study that extended earlier cosmological relic particle density calculations to any hypothetical stable, electrically neutral, weak-scale lepton, showing how such a particle's abundance would "freeze out" in the early Universe and providing analytic expressions that linked its mass and weak interaction cross-section to the present-day matter density. By decoupling the analysis from specific neutrino properties and treating the candidate generically, the authors set out a framework that later became the standard template for weakly interacting massive particles (WIMPs) and for comparing particle-physics models with cosmological constraints. Though subsequent work has refined the methodology and explored many alternative candidates, this paper marked the first explicit, systematic treatment of dark matter as a new particle species beyond the Standard Model. By the late 1970s the existence of dark matter halos around galaxies was widely recognized as real, and became a major unsolved problem in astronomy.

=== 1980s and 90s ===
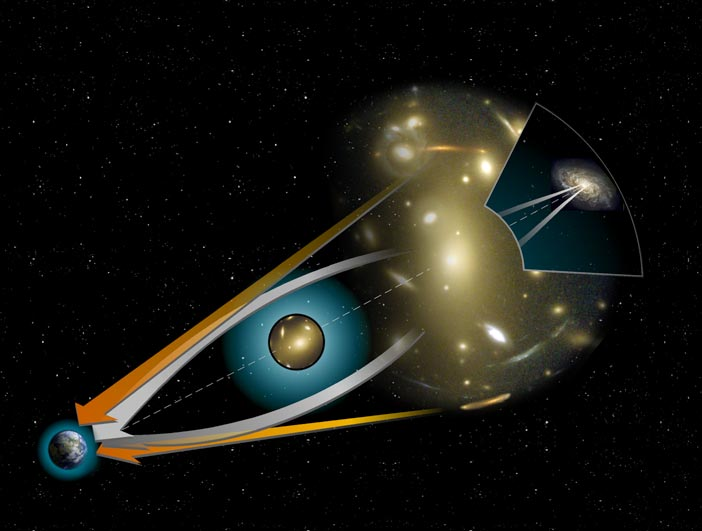
Gravitational lensing bends light around a massive object from a distant source. The orange arrows show the apparent position of the background source. The white arrows show the path of the light from the true position of the source.

A stream of observations in the 1980–1990s supported the presence of dark matter. Persic, Salucci & Stel (1996) is notable for the investigation of 967 spirals. The evidence for dark matter also included gravitational lensing of background objects by galaxy clusters, the temperature distribution of hot gas in galaxies and clusters, and the pattern of anisotropies in the cosmic microwave background.

=== Since 2000 ===
Since the turn of the millennium, the search for particle dark matter has been dominated by the hypothesis of weakly interacting massive particles (WIMPs), driven by hypothesized connections to supersymmetry. Experimental efforts were characterized by a rapid increase in sensitivity using liquid xenon detectors, including XENON, LUX, PandaX, and LUX-ZEPLIN (LZ). Despite pushing interaction limits down by orders of magnitude, these direct detection experiments all reported null results for WIMPs across the standard GeV–TeV mass range. As of late 2025, the LZ experiment had excluded WIMP cross-sections above 9 GeV/c^{2} and reported the first detection of boron-8 solar neutrinos via coherent elastic neutrino-nucleus scattering in a dark matter detector; this marks the experimental entry into the neutrino floor "fog," an irreducible background of neutrino noise that complicates future WIMP searches. Concurrently, the failure of the Large Hadron Collider to detect supersymmetric particles has constrained the theoretical parameter space for WIMPs. These constraints have shifted significant focus toward alternative candidates such as axions. The Axion Dark Matter Experiment achieved sensitivity to the plausible DFSZ axion model in the micro-electronvolt range by the early 2020s.

The prevailing view among cosmologists remains that dark matter is composed primarily of some type of not-yet-characterized subatomic particle. While this remains the majority opinion, the lack of particle detection has led to a divergence in consensus, with macroscopic candidates such as primordial black holes seeing renewed interest following observations by LIGO and the James Webb Space Telescope. The search for such particles, by a variety of means, is one of the major efforts in particle physics.

== Technical definition ==
In standard cosmological calculations, "matter" means any constituent of the universe whose energy density scales with the inverse cube of the scale factor, i.e., ρ ∝ a^{−3}. This is in contrast to "radiation", which scales as the inverse fourth power of the scale factor ρ ∝ a^{−4}, and a cosmological constant, which does not change with respect to a (ρ ∝ a^{0}). The different scaling factors for matter and radiation are a consequence of radiation redshift. For example, after doubling the diameter of the observable Universe via cosmic expansion, the scale, a, has doubled. The energy of the cosmic microwave background radiation has been halved (because the wavelength of each photon has doubled); the energy of ultra-relativistic particles, such as early-era standard-model neutrinos, is similarly halved. (Note: However, in the modern cosmic era, this neutrino field has cooled and started to behave more like matter and less like radiation.) The cosmological constant, as an intrinsic property of space, has a constant energy density regardless of the volume under consideration.

In principle, "dark matter" means all components of the universe which are not visible but still obey ρ ∝ a^{−3}. In practice, the term "dark matter" is often used to mean only the non-baryonic component of dark matter, i.e., excluding "missing baryons". Context will usually indicate which meaning is intended.

== Observational evidence ==
=== Galaxy rotation curves ===
The rotation curve of spiral galaxy UGC 11455. The observed rotation is shown as points with error bars. The expected rotation from normal matter is shown in the line below.

The arms of spiral galaxies rotate around their galactic center. The luminous mass density of a spiral galaxy decreases as one goes from the center to the outskirts. If luminous mass were all the matter, then the galaxy can be modelled as a point mass in the centre and test masses orbiting around it, similar to the Solar System. (Note: This is a consequence of the shell theorem and the observation that spiral galaxies are spherically symmetric to a large extent (in 2D).) From Kepler's Third Law, it is expected that the rotation velocities will decrease with distance from the center, similar to the Solar System. This is not observed. Instead, the galaxy rotation curve remains flat or even increases as distance from the center increases.

If Kepler's laws are correct, then the obvious way to resolve this discrepancy is to conclude the mass distribution in spiral galaxies is not similar to that of the Solar System. In particular, there may be a lot of non-luminous matter (dark matter) in the outskirts of the galaxy.

=== Velocity dispersions ===
Stars in bound systems must obey the virial theorem. The theorem, together with the measured velocity distribution, can be used to measure the mass distribution in a bound system, such as elliptical galaxies or globular clusters. With some exceptions, velocity dispersion estimates of elliptical galaxies do not match the predicted velocity dispersion from the observed mass distribution, even assuming complicated distributions of stellar orbits. As with galaxy rotation curves, the obvious way to resolve the discrepancy is to postulate the existence of non-luminous matter.

=== Galaxy clustering ===
Galaxy clusters are particularly important for dark matter studies since their masses can be estimated in three independent ways:

- From the scatter in radial velocities of the galaxies within clusters
- From X-rays emitted by hot gas in the clusters. From the X-ray energy spectrum and flux, the gas temperature and density can be estimated, hence giving the pressure; assuming pressure and gravity balance determines the cluster's mass profile.
- Gravitational lensing (usually of more distant galaxies) can measure cluster masses without relying on observations of dynamics (e.g., velocity).

Generally, these three methods are in reasonable agreement that dark matter outweighs visible matter by approximately 5 to 1.

The positions in space of the galaxies identified by the VIPERS survey.

On larger scales, large galaxy redshift surveys may be used to make a three-dimensional map of the galaxy distribution. These maps are slightly distorted because distances are estimated from observed redshifts; the redshift contains a contribution from the galaxy's so-called peculiar velocity in addition to the dominant Hubble expansion term. On average, superclusters are expanding more slowly than the cosmic mean due to their gravity, while voids are expanding faster than average. In a redshift map, galaxies in front of a supercluster have excess radial velocities towards it and have redshifts slightly higher than their distance would imply, while galaxies behind the supercluster have redshifts slightly low for their distance. This effect causes superclusters to appear squashed in the radial direction, and likewise voids are stretched. Their angular positions are unaffected. This effect is not detectable for any one structure since the true shape is not known, but can be measured by averaging over many structures. It was predicted quantitatively by Nick Kaiser in 1987, and first decisively measured in 2001 by the 2dF Galaxy Redshift Survey. Results are in agreement with the Lambda-CDM model.

=== Bullet Cluster ===
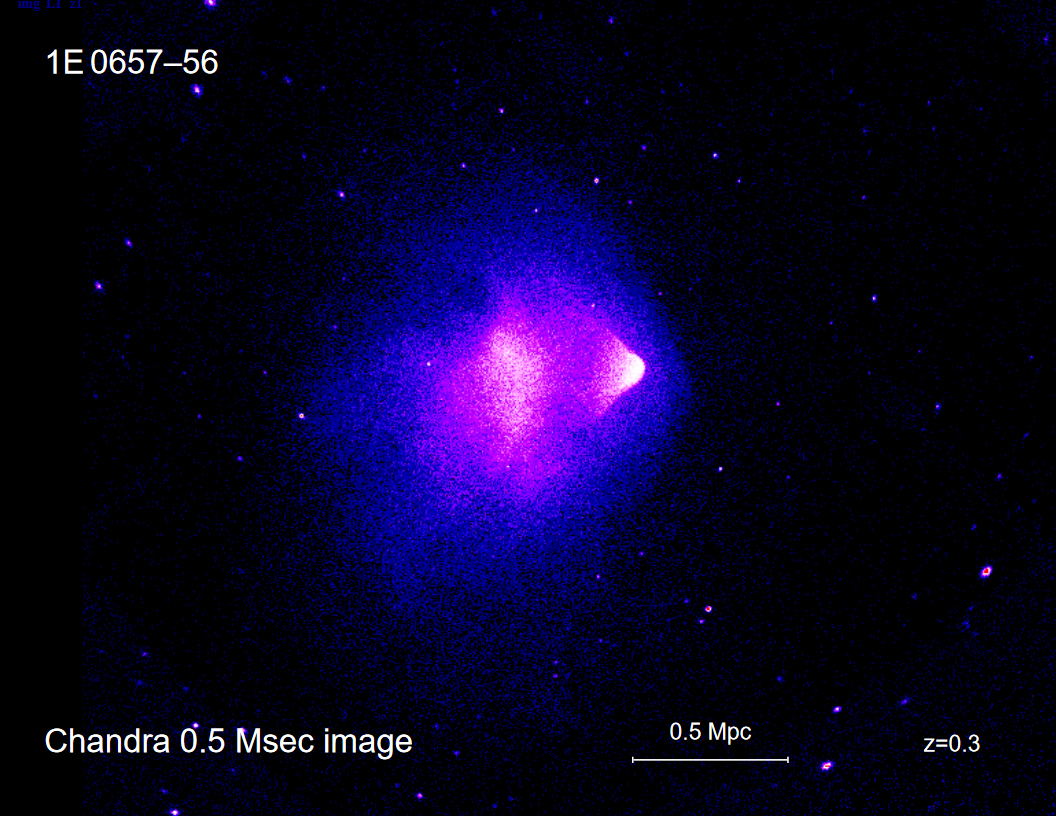
The Bullet Cluster

The bullet cluster is the result of a recent collision of two galaxy clusters. It is of particular note because the location of the center of mass as measured by gravitational lensing is different from the location of the center of mass of visible matter. This is difficult for modified gravity theories, which generally predict lensing around visible matter, to explain. Standard dark matter theory however has no issue: the hot, visible gas in each cluster would be cooled and slowed down by electromagnetic interactions, while dark matter (which does not interact electromagnetically) would not. This leads to the dark matter separating from the visible gas, producing the separate lensing peak as observed.

=== Gravitational lensing ===
One of the consequences of general relativity is the gravitational lens. Gravitational lensing occurs when massive objects between a source of light and the observer act as a lens to bend light from this source. Lensing does not depend on the properties of the mass; it only requires there to be a mass. The more massive an object, the more lensing is observed. An example is a cluster of galaxies lying between a more distant source such as a quasar and an observer. In this case, the galaxy cluster will lens the quasar.

Strong lensing is the observed distortion of background galaxies into arcs when their light passes through such a gravitational lens. It has been observed around many distant clusters including Abell 1689. By measuring the distortion geometry, the mass of the intervening cluster can be obtained. In the weak regime, lensing does not distort background galaxies into arcs, causing minute distortions instead. By examining the apparent shear deformation of the adjacent background galaxies, the mean distribution of dark matter can be characterized. The measured mass-to-light ratios correspond to dark matter densities predicted by other large-scale structure measurements.

=== Type Ia supernova distance measurements ===
Type Ia supernova luminosity relative to the Sun (L_{0}) versus time shows the characteristic light curve for a Type Ia supernova. The peak is primarily due to the decay of nickel (Ni), while the later stage is powered by cobalt (Co).

Type Ia supernovae can be used as standard candles to measure extragalactic distances, which can in turn be used to measure how fast the universe has expanded in the past. Data indicates the universe is expanding at an accelerating rate, the cause of which is usually ascribed to dark energy. Since observations indicate the universe is almost flat, it is expected the total energy density of everything in the universe should sum to 1 (Ω_{tot} ≈ 1). The measured dark energy density is Ω_{Λ} ≈ 0.690; the observed ordinary (baryonic) matter energy density is Ω_{b} ≈ 0.0482 and the energy density of radiation is negligible. This leaves a missing Ω_{dm} ≈ 0.258 which nonetheless behaves like matter (see technical definition section above) – dark matter.

=== Lyman-alpha forest ===
In astronomical spectroscopy, the Lyman-alpha forest is the sum of the absorption lines arising from the Lyman-alpha transition of neutral hydrogen in the spectra of distant galaxies and quasars. Lyman-alpha forest observations can also constrain cosmological models. These constraints agree with those obtained from WMAP data.

=== Cosmic microwave background ===
Although both dark matter and ordinary matter are matter, they do not behave in the same way. In particular, in the early universe, ordinary matter was ionized and interacted strongly with radiation via Thomson scattering. Dark matter does not interact directly with radiation, but it does affect the cosmic microwave background (CMB) by its gravitational potential (mainly on large scales) and by its effects on the density and velocity of ordinary matter. Ordinary and dark matter perturbations, therefore, evolve differently with time and leave different imprints on the CMB.

The CMB is very close to a perfect blackbody but contains very small temperature anisotropies of a few parts in 100,000. A sky map of anisotropies can be decomposed into an angular power spectrum, which is observed to contain a series of acoustic peaks at near-equal spacing but different heights. The locations of these peaks depend on cosmological parameters. Matching theory to data, therefore, constrains cosmological parameters.

The CMB anisotropy was first discovered by COBE in 1992, though this had too coarse resolution to detect the acoustic peaks. After the discovery of the first acoustic peak by the balloon-borne BOOMERanG experiment in 2000, the power spectrum was precisely observed by WMAP in 2003–2012, and even more precisely by the Planck spacecraft in 2013–2015. The results support the Lambda-CDM model. The observed CMB angular power spectrum provides powerful evidence in support of dark matter, as its precise structure is well fitted by the Lambda-CDM model, but difficult to reproduce with any competing model such as modified Newtonian dynamics (MOND).

=== Structure formation ===
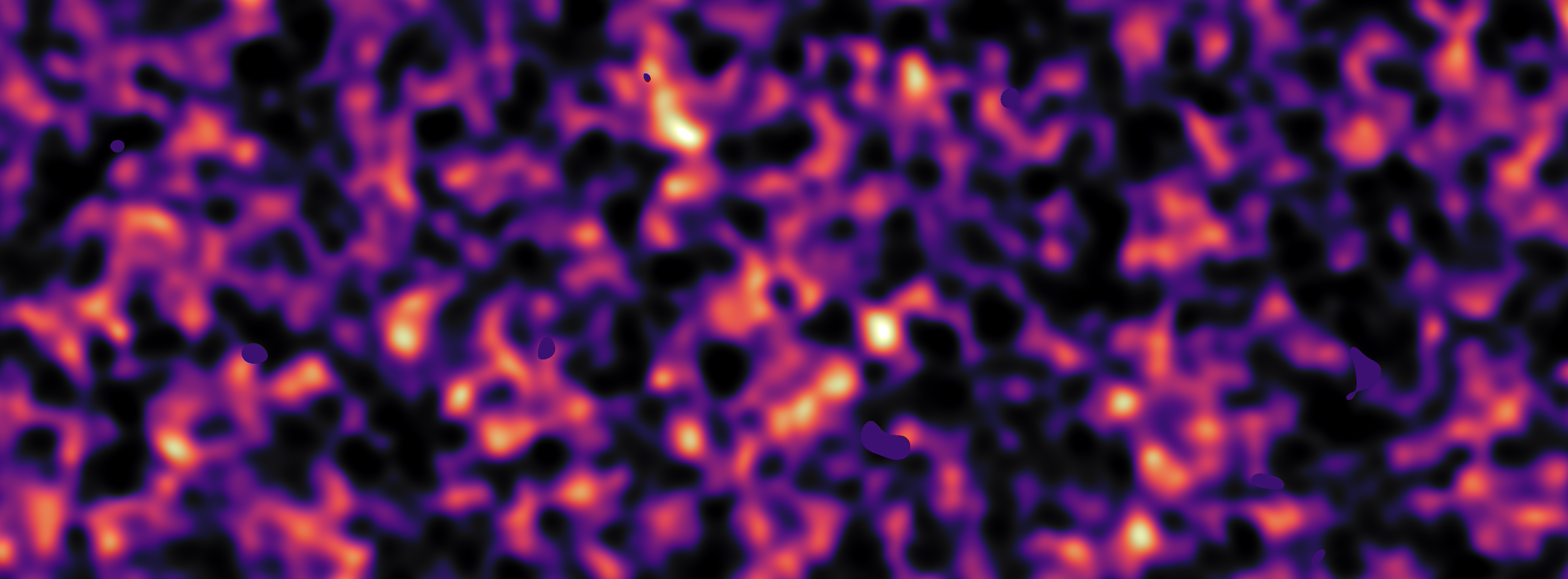
Dark matter map for a patch of sky based on gravitational lensing analysis of a Kilo-Degree Survey

Structure formation refers to the period after the Big Bang when density perturbations collapsed to form stars, galaxies, and clusters. Prior to structure formation, the Friedmann solutions to general relativity describe a homogeneous universe. Later, small anisotropies gradually grew and condensed the homogeneous universe into stars, galaxies and larger structures. Ordinary matter is affected by radiation, which is the dominant element of the universe at very early times. As a result, its density perturbations are washed out and unable to condense into structure. If there were only ordinary matter in the universe, there would not have been enough time for density perturbations to grow into the galaxies and clusters currently seen.

Dark matter provides a solution to this problem because it is unaffected by radiation. Therefore, its density perturbations can grow first. The resulting gravitational potential acts as an attractive potential well for ordinary matter collapsing later, speeding up the structure formation process.

=== Sky surveys and baryon acoustic oscillations ===
Baryon acoustic oscillations (BAO) are fluctuations in the density of the visible baryonic matter (normal matter) of the universe on large scales. These are predicted to arise in the Lambda-CDM model due to acoustic oscillations in the photon–baryon fluid of the early universe and can be observed in the cosmic microwave background angular power spectrum. BAOs set up a preferred length scale for baryons. As the dark matter and baryons clumped together after recombination, the effect is much weaker in the galaxy distribution in the nearby universe, but is detectable as a subtle (~ 1%) preference for pairs of galaxies to be separated by 147 Mpc, compared to those separated by 130–160 Mpc. This feature was predicted theoretically in the 1990s and then discovered in 2005, in two large galaxy redshift surveys, the Sloan Digital Sky Survey and the 2dF Galaxy Redshift Survey. Combining the CMB observations with BAO measurements from galaxy redshift surveys provides a precise estimate of the Hubble constant and the average matter density in the Universe. The results support the Lambda-CDM model.

== Theoretical classifications ==
Dark matter can be divided into cold, warm, and hot categories. These categories refer to velocity rather than an actual temperature, and indicate how far corresponding objects moved due to random motions in the early universe, before they slowed due to cosmic expansion. This distance is called the free streaming length. The categories of dark matter are set with respect to the size of the collection of mass prior to structure formation that later collapses to form a dwarf galaxy. This collection of mass is sometimes called a protogalaxy. Dark matter particles are classified as cold, warm, or hot if their free streaming length is much smaller (cold), similar to (warm), or much larger (hot) than the protogalaxy of a dwarf galaxy. Mixtures of the above are also possible: a theory of mixed dark matter was popular in the mid-1990s, but was rejected following the discovery of dark energy.

The significance of the free streaming length is that the universe began with some primordial density fluctuations from the Big Bang (in turn arising from quantum fluctuations at the microscale). Particles from overdense regions will naturally spread to underdense regions, but because the universe is expanding quickly, there is a time limit for them to do so. Faster particles (hot dark matter) can beat the time limit while slower particles cannot. The particles travel a free streaming length's worth of distance within the time limit; therefore this length sets a minimum scale for later structure formation. Because galaxy-size density fluctuations get washed out by free-streaming, hot dark matter implies the first objects that can form are huge supercluster-size pancakes, which then fragment into galaxies, while the reverse is true for cold dark matter.

Deep-field observations show that galaxies formed first, followed by clusters and superclusters as galaxies clump together, and therefore that most dark matter is cold. This is also the reason why neutrinos, which move at nearly the speed of light and therefore would fall under hot dark matter, cannot make up the bulk of dark matter.

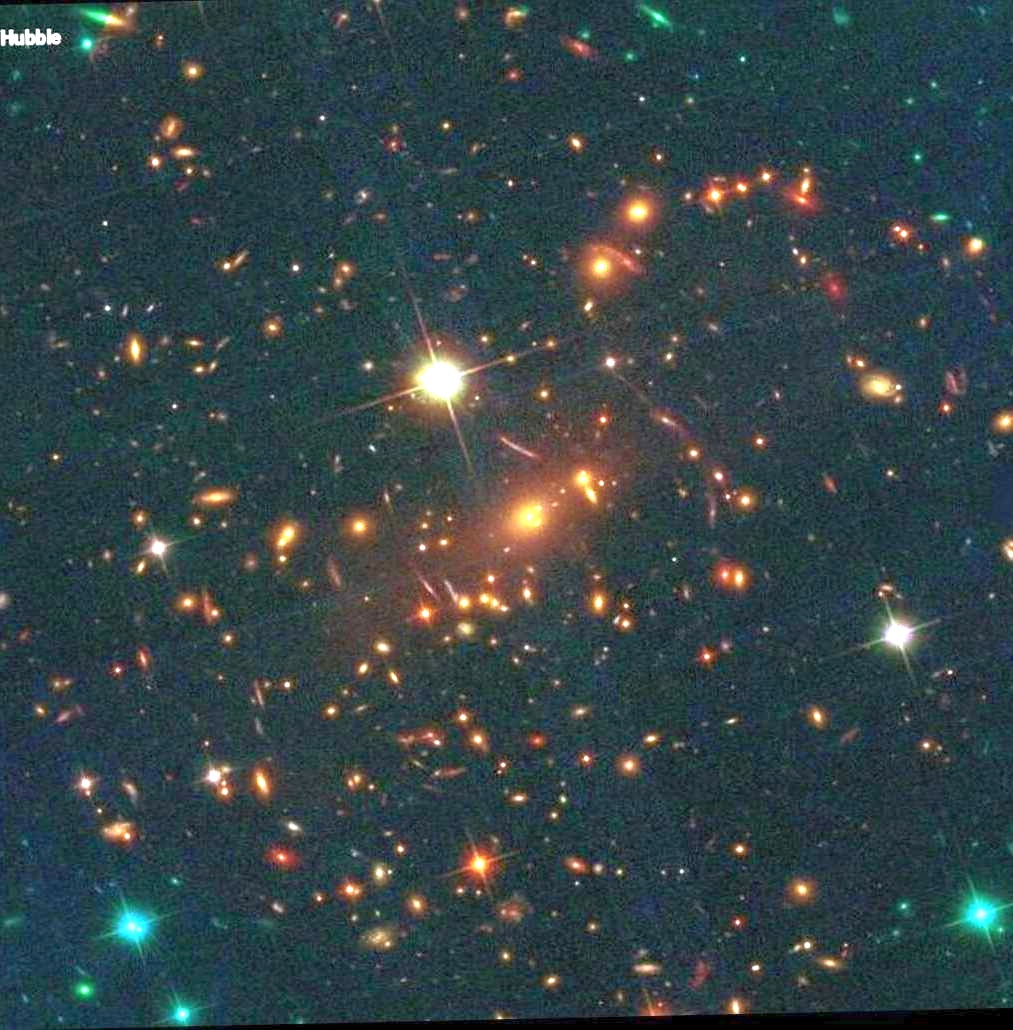
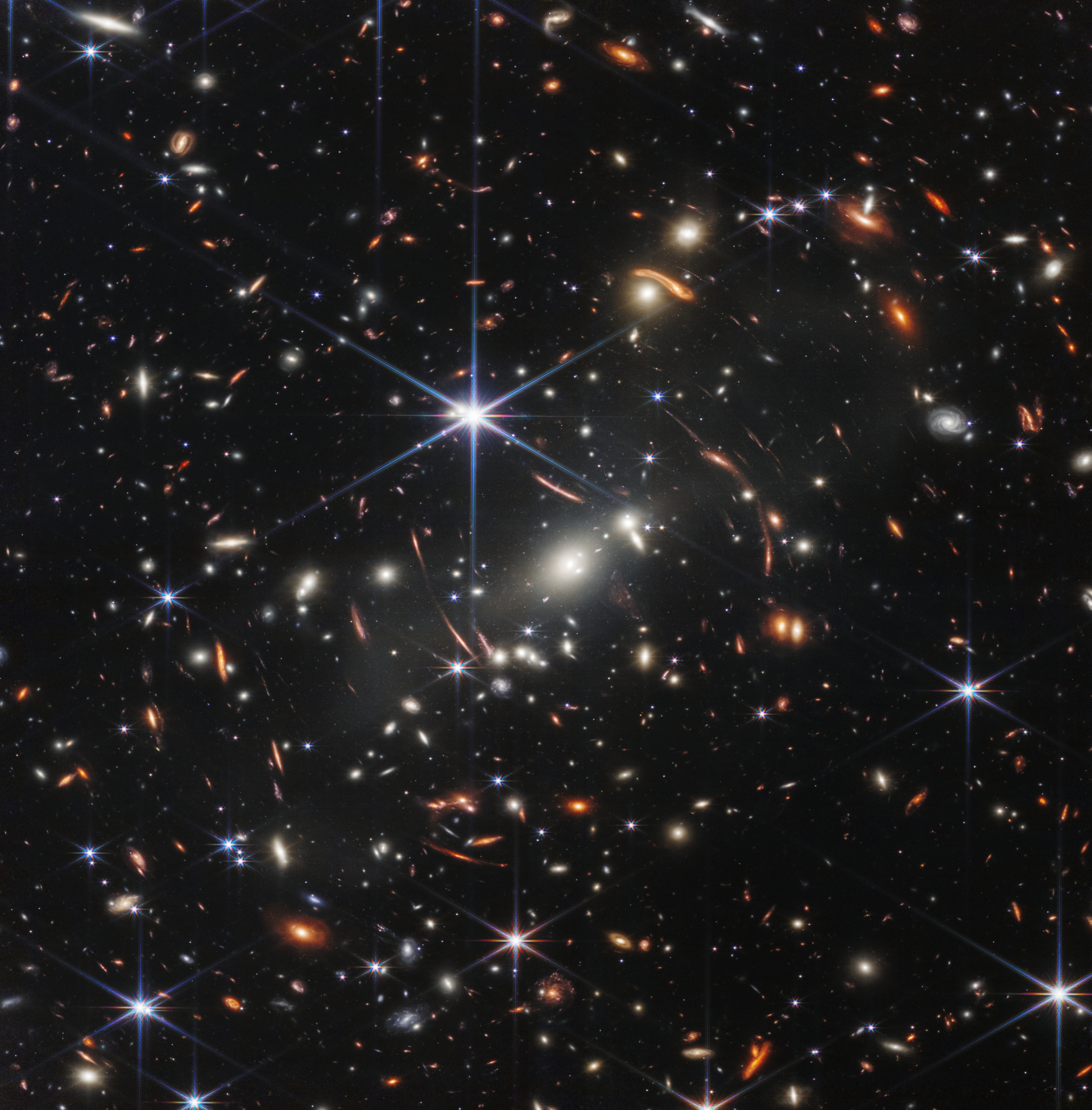
Galaxy cluster SMACS J0723.3-7327 observed with the Hubble Space Telescope (2017, left) and the James Webb Space Telescope (2022, right). Both images show strong gravitational lensing features appearing as galaxies smeared into crescent shapes. JWST images show much higher sensitivity and resolution at infrared wavelengths, allowing it to see more distant, fainter objects in clearer detail.

== Composition ==
Different dark matter particle candidates by mass in electron volts (eV)

The identity of dark matter is unknown, but there are many hypotheses about what dark matter could consist of, as set out in the table below.

Major dark matter hypotheses
Light bosons	Axions
Light bosons	Axion-like particles
Light bosons	Fuzzy cold dark matter
Neutrinos	Standard Model (Note: The three neutrino types already observed are indeed abundant, and dark, and matter, but their individual masses are almost certainly too tiny to account for more than a small fraction of dark matter, due to limits derived from large-scale structure and high-redshift galaxies.)
Neutrinos	Sterile neutrinos
Other particles	Lightest supersymmetric particle
Other particles	Weakly interacting massive particles (WIMPs)
Other particles	Self-interacting dark matter
Other particles	Atomic dark matter
Other particles	Strangelet
Macroscopic	Primordial black holes (PBHs)
Macroscopic	Other massive compact halo objects (MACHOs)

Fermi-LAT observations of dwarf galaxies provide new insights on dark matter.

=== Baryonic matter ===
Dark matter can refer to any substance which interacts predominantly via gravity with visible matter (e.g., stars and planets). Hence in principle it need not be composed of a new type of fundamental particle but could, at least in part, be made up of standard baryonic matter, such as protons or neutrons. Most of the ordinary matter familiar to astronomers, including planets, brown dwarfs, red dwarfs, visible stars, white dwarfs, neutron stars, and black holes, fall into this category. A black hole would ingest both baryonic and non-baryonic matter that comes close enough to its event horizon; afterwards, the distinction between the two is lost.

These massive objects that are hard to detect are collectively known as MACHOs. Some scientists initially hoped that baryonic MACHOs could account for and explain all the dark matter.

However, multiple lines of evidence suggest the majority of dark matter is not baryonic:

- Sufficient diffuse, baryonic gas or dust would be visible when backlit by stars.
- The theory of Big Bang nucleosynthesis predicts the observed abundance of the chemical elements. If there are more baryons, then there should also be more helium, lithium and heavier elements synthesized during the Big Bang. Agreement with observed abundances requires that baryonic matter makes up between 4–5% of the universe's critical density. In contrast, large-scale structure and other observations indicate that the total matter density is about 30% of the critical density.
- Astronomical searches for gravitational microlensing in the Milky Way found at most only a small fraction of the dark matter may be in dark, compact, conventional objects (MACHOs, etc.); the excluded range of object masses is from half the Earth's mass up to 30 solar masses, which covers nearly all the plausible candidates.
- Detailed analysis of the small irregularities (anisotropies) in the cosmic microwave background by WMAP and Planck indicate that around five-sixths of the total matter is in a form that only interacts significantly with ordinary matter or photons through gravitational effects.

=== Non-baryonic matter ===
There are two main candidates for non-baryonic dark matter: new particles and primordial black holes. Unlike baryonic matter, nonbaryonic particles do not contribute to the formation of the elements in the early universe (Big Bang nucleosynthesis) and so its presence is felt only via its gravitational effects (such as weak lensing). In addition, some dark matter candidates can interact with themselves (self-interacting dark matter) or with ordinary particles (e.g. WIMPs), possibly resulting in observable by-products such as gamma rays and neutrinos (indirect detection). Candidates abound (see the table above), each with their own strengths and weaknesses.

==== Particle candidates ====
===== Weakly Interacting Massive Particles =====
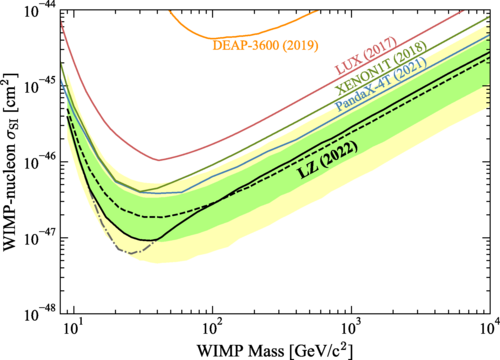
Upper limits for WIMP-nucleon elastic cross sections from selected experiments as reported by the LZ experiment in July 2023.

There exists no formal definition of a Weakly Interacting Massive Particle (WIMP), but broadly, it is an elementary particle which interacts via gravity and any other force (or forces) which is as weak as or weaker than the weak nuclear force, but also non-vanishing in strength. Many WIMP candidates are expected to have been produced thermally in the early Universe, similarly to the particles of the Standard Model according to Big Bang cosmology, and usually will constitute cold dark matter. Obtaining the correct abundance of dark matter today via thermal production requires a self-annihilation cross section of $\langle \sigma v \rangle$ ≃ 3×10^{−26} cm^{3}⋅s^{−1}, which is roughly what is expected for a new particle in the 100 GeV/c^{2} mass range that interacts via the electroweak force.

Because supersymmetric extensions of the Standard Model of particle physics readily predict a new particle with these properties, this apparent coincidence has been called the "WIMP miracle", and a stable supersymmetric partner has long been a prime explanation for dark matter. Experimental efforts to detect WIMPs include the search for products of WIMP annihilation, including gamma rays, neutrinos and cosmic rays in nearby galaxies and galaxy clusters; direct detection experiments designed to measure the collision of WIMPs with nuclei in the laboratory, as well as attempts to directly produce WIMPs in colliders, such as the Large Hadron Collider at CERN. In the early 2010s, results from direct-detection experiments along with the lack of evidence for supersymmetry at the Large Hadron Collider (LHC) experiment have cast doubt on the simplest WIMP hypothesis.

===== Axions =====
Axions are hypothetical elementary particles originally theorized in 1978 independently by Frank Wilczek and Steven Weinberg as the Goldstone boson of Peccei–Quinn theory, which had been proposed in 1977 to solve the strong CP problem in quantum chromodynamics (QCD). QCD effects produce an effective periodic potential in which the axion field moves. Expanding the potential about one of its minima, one finds that the product of the axion mass with the axion decay constant is determined by the topological susceptibility of the QCD vacuum. An axion with mass that is much less than 60 keV/c^{2} is long-lived and weakly interacting: a perfect dark matter candidate.

The oscillations of the axion field about the minimum of the effective potential, the so-called misalignment mechanism, generate a cosmological population of cold axions with an abundance depending on the mass of the axion. With a mass above 5 μeV/c^{2} (10^{−11} times the electron mass) axions could account for dark matter, and thus be both a dark-matter candidate and a solution to the strong CP problem. If inflation occurs at a low scale and lasts sufficiently long, the axion mass can be as low as 1 peV/c^{2}.

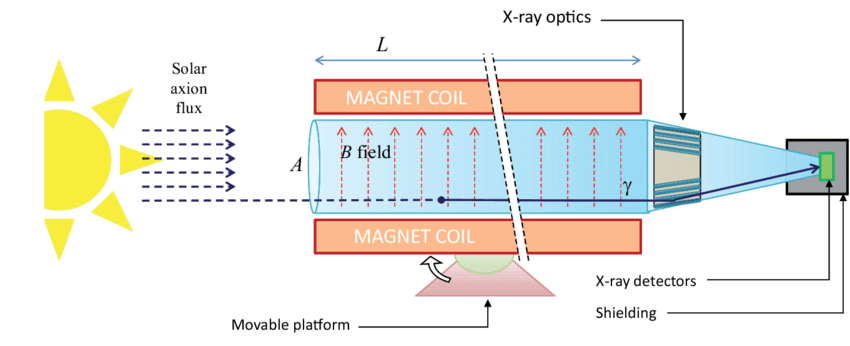
Principle of operation of the IAXO/BabyIAXO helioscope experiment for detecting axions

Because axions have extremely low mass, their de Broglie wavelength is very large, in turn meaning that quantum effects could help resolve the small-scale problems of the Lambda-CDM model. A single ultralight axion with a decay constant at the grand unified theory scale provides the correct relic density without fine-tuning. Axions as a dark matter candidate have gained in popularity in recent years, because of the non-detection of WIMPs.

===== Particle aggregation and dense dark matter objects =====
If dark matter is composed of weakly interacting particles, then an obvious question is whether it can form objects equivalent to planets, stars, or black holes. Historically, the answer has been it cannot, (Note: "One widely held belief about dark matter is it cannot cool off by radiating energy. If it could, then it might bunch together and create compact objects in the same way baryonic matter forms planets, stars, and galaxies. Observations so far suggest dark matter doesn't do that – it resides only in diffuse halos ... As a result, it is extremely unlikely there are very dense objects like stars made out of entirely (or even mostly) dark matter." — Buckley & Difranzo (2018)) because of two factors:

- It lacks an efficient means to lose energy

Ordinary matter forms dense objects because it has numerous ways to lose energy. Losing energy would be essential for object formation, because a particle that gains energy during compaction or falling "inward" under gravity, and cannot lose it any other way, will heat up and increase velocity and momentum. Dark matter appears to lack a means to lose energy, simply because it is not capable of interacting strongly in other ways except through gravity. The virial theorem suggests that such a particle would not stay bound to the gradually forming object – as the object began to form and compact, the dark matter particles within it would speed up and tend to escape.

- It lacks a diversity of interactions needed to form structures

Ordinary matter interacts in many different ways, which allows the matter to form more complex structures. For example, stars form through gravity, but the particles within them interact and can emit energy in the form of neutrinos and electromagnetic radiation through fusion when they become energetic enough. Protons and neutrons can bind via the strong interaction and then form atoms with electrons largely through electromagnetic interaction. There is no evidence that dark matter is capable of such a wide variety of interactions, since it seems to only interact through gravity (and possibly through some means no stronger than the weak interaction, although until dark matter is better understood, this is only speculation).

==== Primordial black holes ====
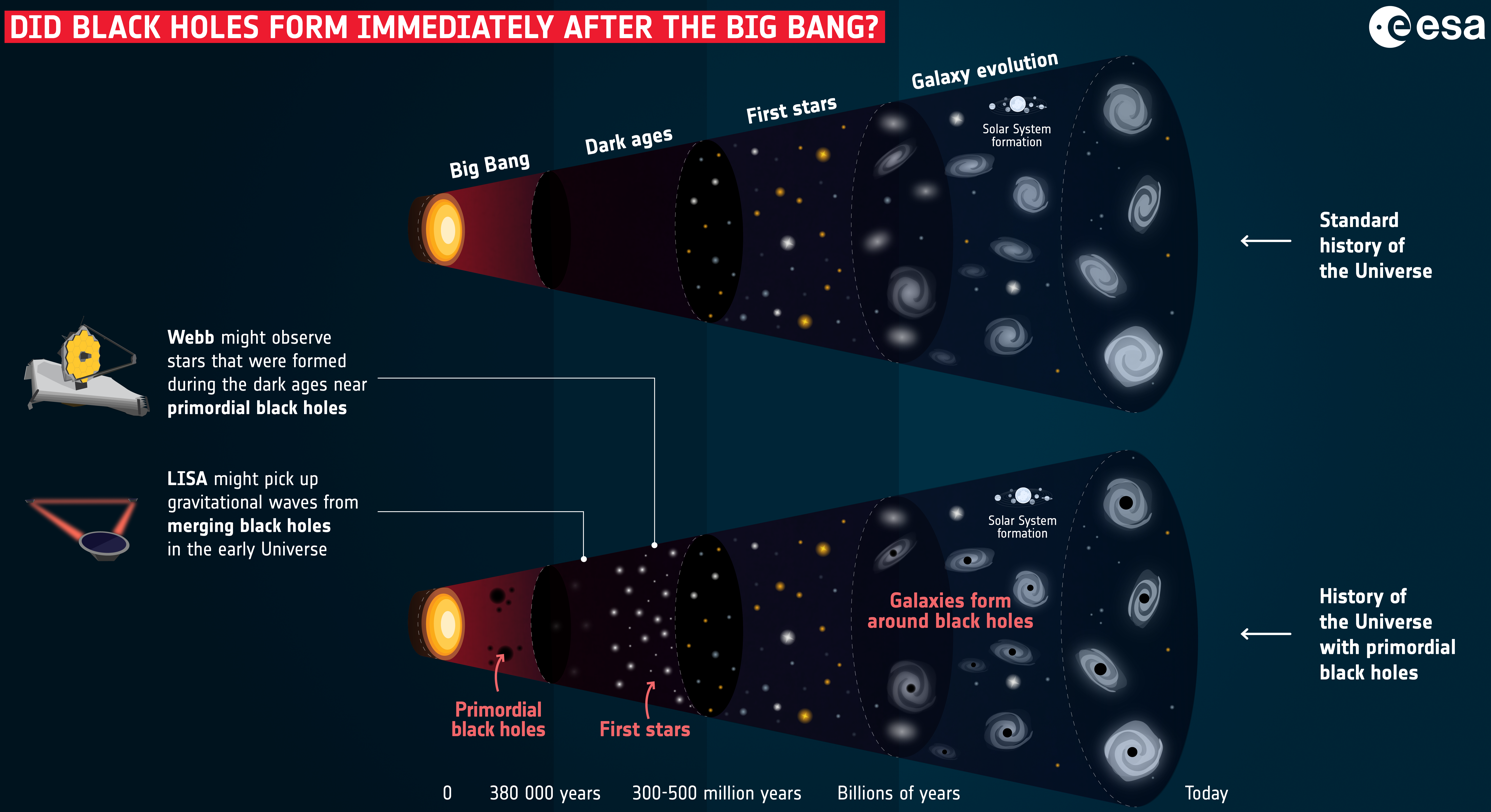
Formation of the universe without (above) and with (below) primordial black holes

Primordial black holes (PBHs) are hypothetical black holes that formed soon after the Big Bang. In the inflationary era and early radiation-dominated universe, extremely dense pockets of subatomic matter may have been tightly packed to the point of gravitational collapse, creating black holes without the supernova compression typically needed to create stellar black holes. The idea was first suggested by Yakov Zeldovich and Igor Dmitriyevich Novikov in 1966, and independently by Stephen Hawking in 1971. Because PBHs would form prior to stellar evolution, they are non-baryonic dark matter candidates and are not limited to the narrow mass range of stellar black holes; they could range from Planck-mass relics to supermassive scales.

Interest in PBHs as a primary component of dark matter was revived following the 2015 discovery of gravitational waves by LIGO. Their first detected merger involved black holes of approximately 30 solar masses; such objects are difficult to explain via standard stellar collapse but fit the predicted mass range for PBHs formed during the QCD transition in the early universe. This interest was bolstered in November 2025, when the LIGO/Virgo/KAGRA collaboration reported a candidate gravitational wave signal from a sub-solar mass merger. As no astrophysical process is known to produce black holes below the Chandrasekhar limit (~1.4 solar masses), confirmed sub-solar mass objects would be strong evidence for a primordial origin. As there have been no gravitational waves detected at z>1 (>6 Gya), and the sensitivity to lower-mass collisions falls off with distance, we are not currently able to detect collisions in the earliest half of the age of the universe.

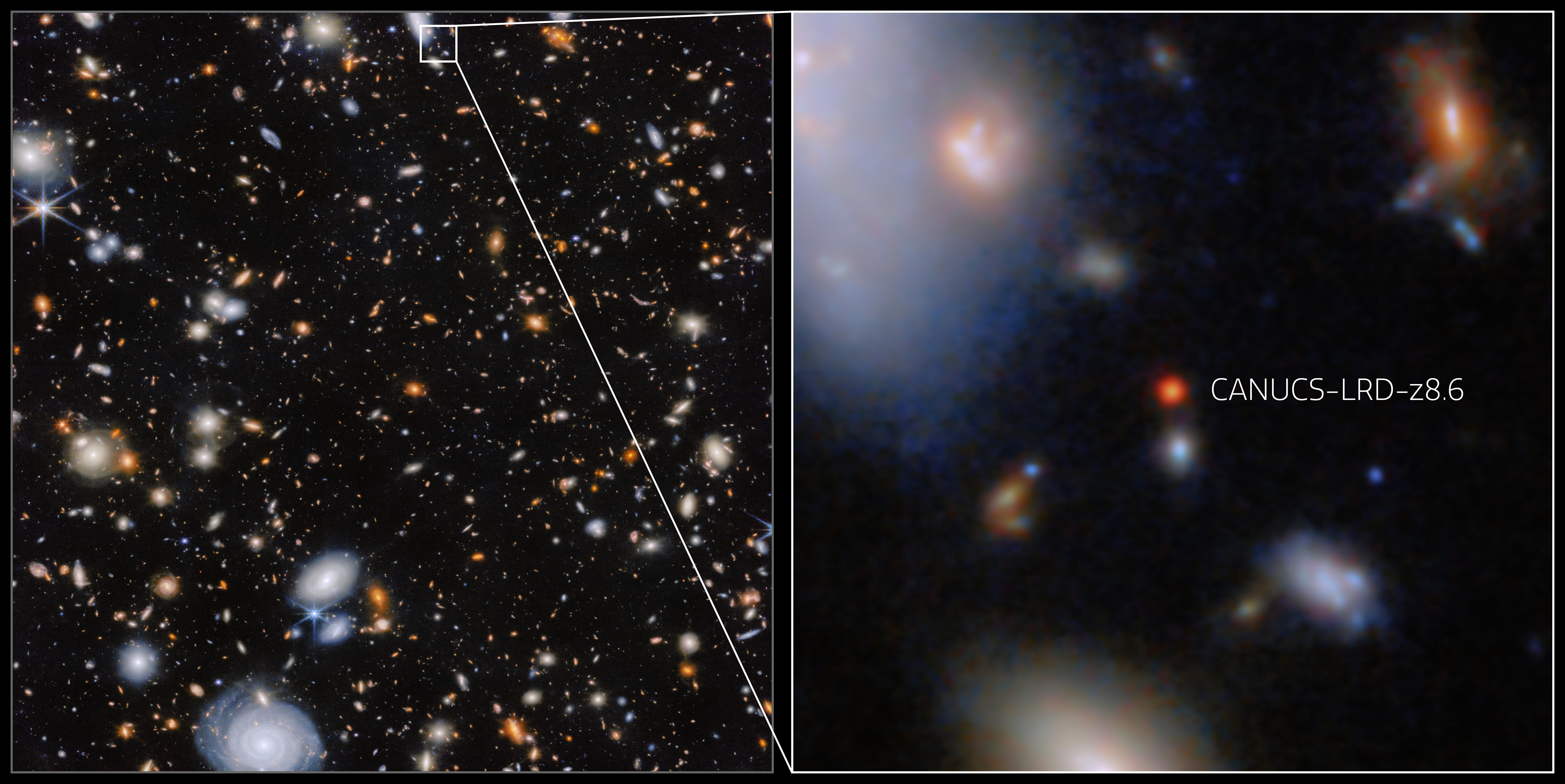
November 2025 JWST observations confirmed an actively growing supermassive black hole within a "little red dot" galaxy named CANUCS-LRD-z8.6.

Further support for the PBH hypothesis has emerged from James Webb Space Telescope (JWST) observations of the high-redshift universe (z > 7). JWST discovered unexpected populations of "Little Red Dots" (LRDs, compact very high redshift objects) and "overmassive black hole galaxies" such as UHZ1 and GHZ2, which contain supermassive black holes appearing less than 500 million years after the Big Bang and outweighing their galaxy's stars. These active galactic nuclei challenge standard models of accretion from "light" stellar black hole seeds, and suggest "heavy seeds" formed via direct collapse or PBHs, which could account for a significant fraction of dark matter halos.

Various observational constraints, such as gravitational microlensing data from the Subaru Telescope (HSC) and from Voyager 1 electron-positron data have ruled out PBHs constituting 100% of dark matter in specific mass windows (e.g., evaporating tiny black holes or monochromatic intermediate-mass populations). However, those constraints assume all PBHs have the same mass, a monochromatic mass distribution. More recent analyses utilizing extended mass distributions, predicted by inflation models and evident in gravitational wave and JWST observations, remove such constraints. A 2024 review indicates that PBHs with a broad, platykurtic mass distribution peaking around one solar mass could explain the entirety of dark matter, or coexist with other candidates in a mixed dark matter scenario.

===== Fine tuning issues =====
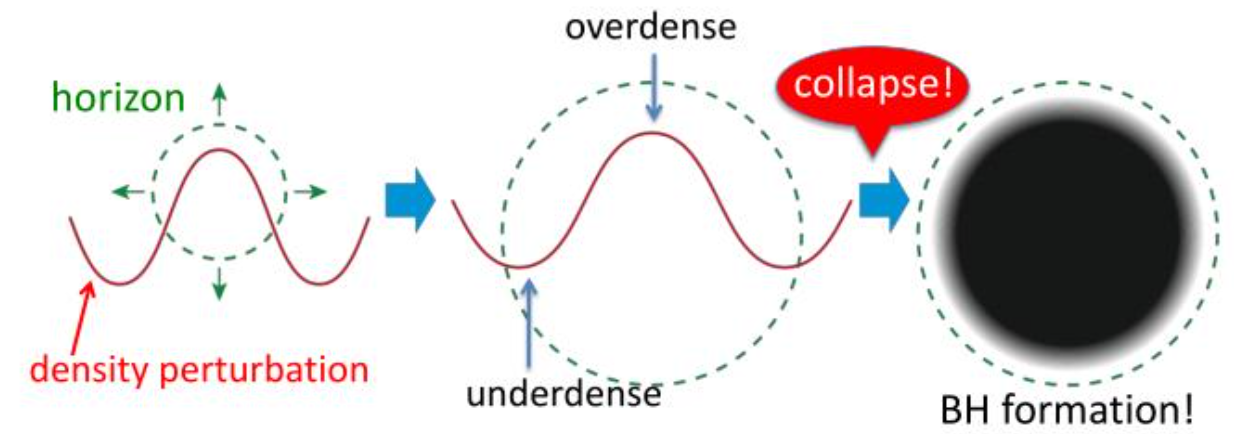
Primordial black holes were possibly formed by the collapse of overdense regions in the inflationary or early radiation-dominated universe.

The primary theoretical challenge to the PBH hypothesis is the physical mechanism of their formation. Standard models of cosmic inflation, known as "slow-roll inflation", generate density fluctuations that are far too small to trigger primordial collapse. Consequently, producing the required abundance of PBHs typically necessitates "exotic" inflation models, often featuring inflection points, bumps, or plateaus in the inflaton potential, which can amplify fluctuations by orders of magnitude. Critics argue that these models require significant fine-tuning, as the resulting PBH abundance is exponentially sensitive to the amplitude of these fluctuations; meaning that a slight deviation in parameters results in either a negligible amount of dark matter or a universe dominated entirely by black holes. However, proponents contend that as the natural parameter space for WIMPs is increasingly excluded by null results from all detection experiments, particle dark matter theories now require comparable levels of fine-tuning. Furthermore, proponents argue that the specific mass structures predicted by these exotic inflation models provide a unified explanation for observational anomalies seen by LIGO and JWST that particle models do not address.

To address the fine-tuning problem, recent research has focused on mechanisms that generate the required fluctuations through natural physical processes rather than manual adjustments to the inflaton potential. One such mechanism is the QCD phase transition; as the universe cooled through this epoch, the reduction in the equation of state (pressure) naturally lowered the threshold for gravitational collapse. This effect automatically enhances the formation of black holes at the solar mass scale, comparable to those detected by gravitational wave observatories, without requiring a precisely tuned peak in the inflation power spectrum. Additionally, models involving multiple scalar fields can produce sharp spikes in density fluctuations through dynamic interactions, such as rapid turns in the field trajectory, which derive the necessary conditions from the model's geometric structure rather than from fine-tuned parameters.

== Particle searches ==
If dark matter is made up of subatomic particles, then millions, possibly billions, of such particles must pass through every square centimeter of the Earth each second. Many experiments aim to test this hypothesis. Although WIMPs have been the main search candidates, axions have drawn renewed attention, with the Axion Dark Matter Experiment (ADMX) searches for axions and many more planned in the future. Another candidate is heavy hidden sector particles which only interact with ordinary matter via gravity. These experiments can be divided into two classes: direct detection experiments, which search for the scattering of dark matter particles off atomic nuclei within a detector; and indirect detection, which look for the products of dark matter particle annihilations or decays.

=== Direct particle detection ===
Direct detection experiments aim to observe interactions between dark matter particles passing through the Earth and ordinary matter detector targets. For Weakly interacting massive particles (WIMPs), the primary signature is a low-energy recoil of nuclei (typically a few keV), which induces energy in the form of scintillation light, ionization, or phonons (heat). For axions, experiments typically search for the conversion of axions into photons within a strong magnetic field (the Primakoff effect).

To detect these rare events effectively, it is crucial to maintain an extremely low background, which is why such experiments typically operate deep underground where interference from cosmic rays is minimized. Major underground laboratories hosting these experiments include SNOLAB (Canada), LNGS (Italy), CJPL (China), and the SURF (USA).

==== WIMPs ====
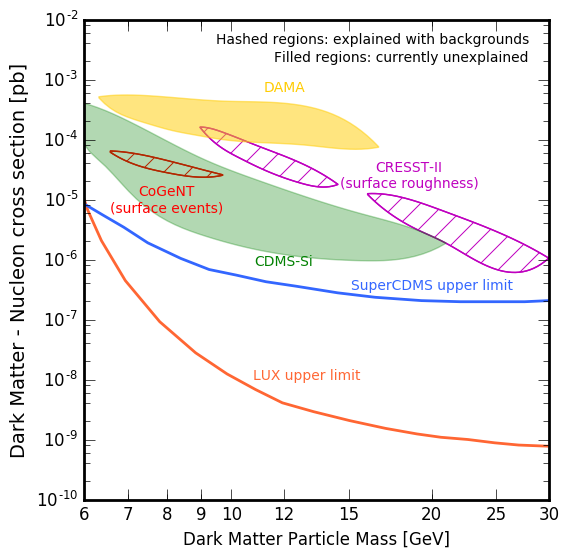
Plot showing the parameter space of dark matter particle mass and interaction cross section with nucleons. The LUX and SuperCDMS limits exclude the parameter space above the labelled curves. The CoGeNT and CRESST-II regions indicate regions which were previously thought to correspond to dark matter signals, but which were later explained with mundane sources. The DAMA and CDMS-Si data remain unexplained, and these regions indicate the preferred parameter space if these anomalies are due to dark matter.

WIMP searches mostly use either cryogenic or noble liquid detector technologies. Cryogenic detectors, operating at temperatures below 100 mK, detect the heat produced when a particle hits an atom in a crystal absorber such as germanium. Experiments using this technology include SuperCDMS and EDELWEISS.

Noble liquid detectors detect scintillation and ionization produced by a particle collision in liquid xenon or argon. This technology has led the field in sensitivity for the last decade. Major current experiments include LZ (at SURF), XENONnT (at LNGS), and PandaX-4T (at CJPL), with future argon-based projects like DarkSide-20k in development.

As of 2026, there has been no confirmed detection of dark matter from these standard WIMP searches. Instead, experiments have placed strong upper limits on the particle's interaction cross-section with nucleons. In late 2025, the LZ experiment reported the exclusion of WIMP cross-sections above 9 GeV/c^{2} and the first detection of boron-8 solar neutrinos via coherent elastic neutrino-nucleus scattering in a dark matter detector. This was the first experimental entry into the "neutrino fog", an irreducible background of neutrino interactions that mimics dark matter signals and complicates future WIMP searches.

==== Axions ====
As WIMP parameter space has become increasingly constrained, focus has also shifted toward axion searches. These experiments, such as the Axion Dark Matter Experiment, typically use resonant microwave cavities rather than nuclear recoil targets. By the early 2020s, ADMX had achieved sensitivity to the plausible DFSZ axion model in the micro-electronvolt range.

==== Annual modulation and directionality ====
Despite the null results from major noble liquid and cryogenic experiments, the DAMA/NaI and DAMA/LIBRA collaborations have famously observed an annual modulation in their event rate, which they claim is due to the Earth's motion through the dark matter halo. This claim remains in tension with the negative results from the more sensitive experiments (LZ, XENON, SuperCDMS) described above.

A special case of direct detection involves directional sensitivity, which attempts to correlate WIMP signals with the direction of the Solar System's motion towards Cygnus. Directional experiments using low-pressure time projection chambers include DMTPC, DRIFT, CYGNUS, and MIMAC.

=== Indirect particle detection ===
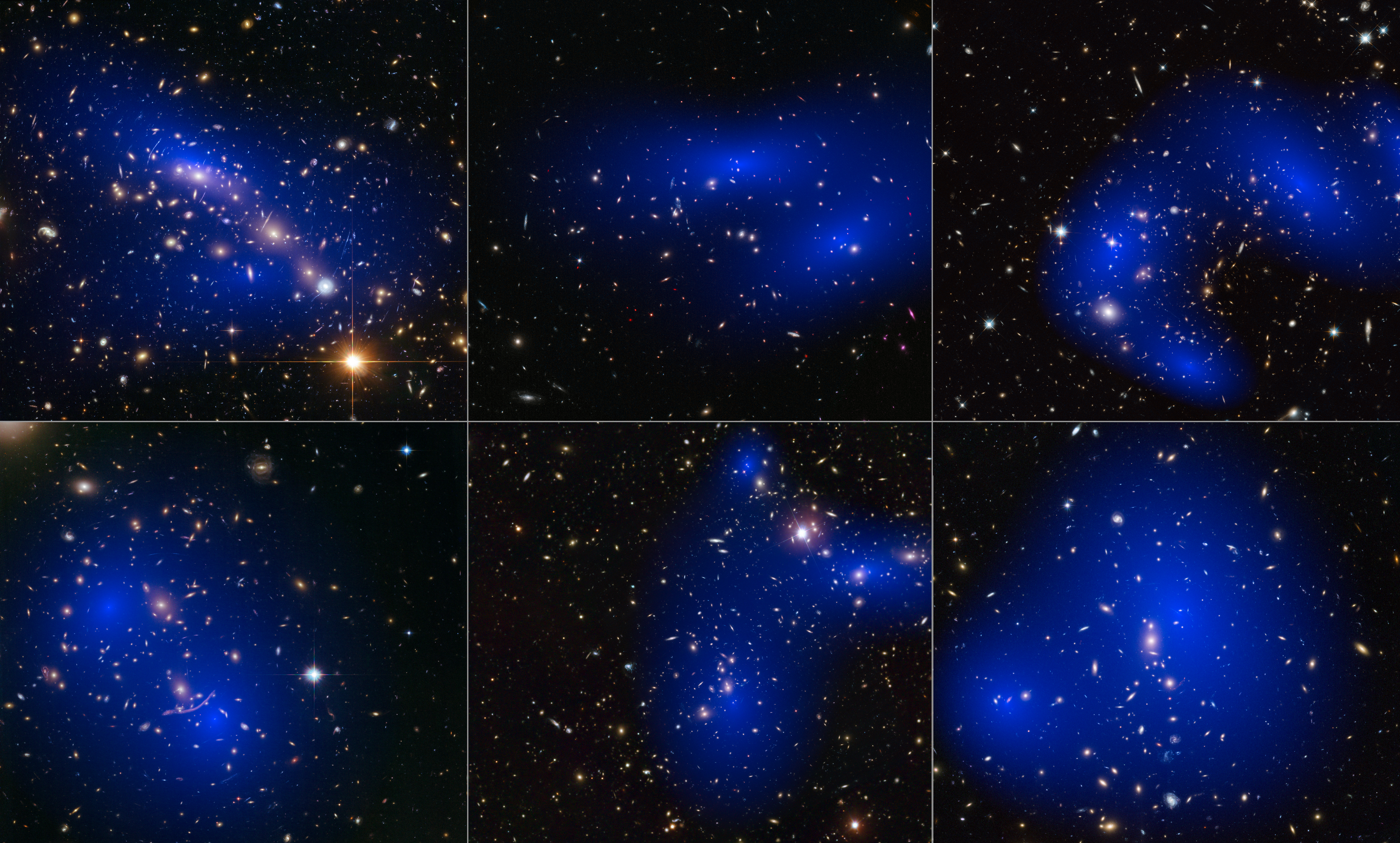
Collage of six cluster collisions with dark matter maps. The clusters were observed in a study of how dark matter in clusters of galaxies behaves when the clusters collide.

Video about the potential gamma-ray detection of dark matter annihilation around supermassive black holes. (Duration 0:03:13, also see file description.)

Indirect detection experiments search for the products of the self-annihilation or decay of dark matter particles in outer space. For example, in regions of high dark matter density (e.g., the centre of the Milky Way) two dark matter particles could annihilate to produce gamma rays or Standard Model particle–antiparticle pairs. Alternatively, if a dark matter particle is unstable, it could decay into Standard Model (or other) particles. These processes could be detected indirectly through an excess of gamma rays, antiprotons or positrons emanating from high density regions in the Milky Way and other galaxies. A major difficulty inherent in such searches is that various astrophysical sources can mimic the signal expected from dark matter, and so multiple signals are likely required for a conclusive discovery.

A few of the dark matter particles passing through the Sun or Earth may scatter off atoms and lose energy. Thus dark matter may accumulate at the center of these bodies, increasing the chance of collision/annihilation. This could produce a distinctive signal in the form of high-energy neutrinos. Such a signal would be strong indirect proof of WIMP dark matter. High-energy neutrino telescopes such as AMANDA, IceCube and ANTARES are searching for this signal. Many experimental searches have been undertaken to look for such emission from dark matter annihilation or decay, examples of which follow:

- The Energetic Gamma Ray Experiment Telescope observed more gamma rays in 2008 than expected from the Milky Way, but scientists concluded this was most likely due to incorrect estimation of the telescope's sensitivity.
- The Fermi Gamma-ray Space Telescope is searching for similar gamma rays. In 2009, an as yet unexplained surplus of gamma rays from the Milky Way's galactic center was found in Fermi data. This Galactic Center GeV excess might be due to dark matter annihilation or to a population of pulsars. In April 2012, an analysis of previously available data from Fermi's Large Area Telescope instrument produced statistical evidence of a 130 GeV signal in the gamma radiation coming from the center of the Milky Way. WIMP annihilation was seen as the most probable explanation.
- At higher energies, ground-based gamma-ray telescopes have set limits on the annihilation of dark matter in dwarf spheroidal galaxies and in clusters of galaxies.
- The PAMELA experiment (launched in 2006) detected excess positrons. They could be from dark matter annihilation or from pulsars. No excess antiprotons were observed.
- In 2013, results from the Alpha Magnetic Spectrometer on the International Space Station indicated excess high-energy cosmic rays which could be due to dark matter annihilation.

The detection by LIGO in September 2015 of gravitational waves opens the possibility of observing dark matter in a new way, particularly if it is in the form of primordial black holes.

==== Astrophysical observations ====
Logarithmic plot of size and mass of celestial objects from particles to galaxies

Beyond searching for annihilation products, astrophysicists are using celestial objects as natural detectors to constrain dark matter particle properties.

- Stellar heating: If dark matter particles capture inside dense stars like neutron stars or white dwarfs, they can deposit kinetic energy during the capture process or through subsequent annihilation. This mechanism, known as "dark kinetic heating", would maintain the star at a temperature higher than expected for its age, potentially arresting its cooling indefinitely. The observation of old, "cold" neutron stars therefore places stringent limits on the scattering cross-section of dark matter particles with nucleons, as any significant interaction would have kept these stars hotter than observed.
- Stellar cooling: New light particles, such as axions, could be produced in the hot cores of stars and escape freely, carrying away energy. This additional energy loss channel would alter the evolution of stars, cooling them faster than standard models predict. Comparisons of observed red giant branch tips and white dwarf cooling curves with theoretical models have set some of the strongest constraints on the coupling of axions to electrons and photons.
- Black hole superradiance: Ultralight bosons, such as axions or dark photons, can extract rotational energy from spinning black holes through a process called superradiance. If the boson's Compton wavelength is comparable to the black hole's event horizon size, the particles form a dense "boson cloud" around the black hole, rapidly slowing its spin on astrophysical timescales. The observation of rapidly spinning black holes in X-ray binaries or through gravitational waves excludes the existence of such particles in specific mass ranges, as their existence would have spun these black holes down long ago.

=== Collider searches ===
Schematic illustration of Dark Matter (DM) interactions and their corresponding experimental detection techniques, with time flowing from left to right. Fig. (a) shows DM annihilation to Standard Model (SM) particles, as sought by Indirect Detection (ID) experiments. Fig. (b) shows DM -> SM particle scattering, targeted by Direct Detection (DD) experiments. Fig. (c) shows the production of DM particles from the annihilation of SM particles at colliders. Fig. (d) shows again the pair production of DM at colliders as in (c), but in this case the interaction occurs through a mediator particle between DM and SM particles.

An alternative approach to the detection of dark matter particles in nature is to produce them in a laboratory. Experiments with the Large Hadron Collider (LHC) may be able to detect dark matter particles produced in collisions of the LHC proton beams. Because a dark matter particle should have negligible interactions with normal visible matter, it may be detected indirectly as large amounts of missing energy and momentum that escape the detectors, provided other non-negligible collision products are detected.

==== Constraints on supersymmetry ====
For decades, the leading candidate for dark matter was the lightest neutralino predicted by supersymmetry. However, extensive searches through the conclusion of the LHC's run 3 (2022–2025) operations have failed to detect the superpartners (such as squarks and gluinos) predicted by supersymmetry models. By late 2025, the ATLAS and CMS collaborations had pushed exclusion limits for gluinos beyond 2.4 TeV, and limits for charginos and neutralinos ("electroweak-inos") beyond 1 TeV in many scenarios. This persistent absence has ruled out the most favored parameter space for WIMPs, forcing theorists to consider more complex and fine-tuned models such as "split supersymmetry", or to abandon supersymmetry candidates entirely.

==== Shift to dark sectors and exotic signatures ====
In response to these null results, experimental focus has shifted toward "dark sector" theories and more exotic signatures that might have evaded earlier experiments. Recent analyses from 2024 and 2025 have targeted signatures that do not fit the expected missing energy profile:

- Long-lived particles: These are particles that travel centimeters or meters through the detector before decaying, creating "displaced vertices" or "disappearing tracks." New triggers implemented in Run 3 specifically targeted these events, particularly looking for long-lived charginos that decay into invisible dark matter and very soft pions.
- Dark jets and semi-visible jets: Signatures where dark matter is produced alongside visible matter in complex showers, which look different from standard quark-gluon jets. In 2025, ATLAS released results on "emerging jets" that appear mid-flight within the detector, setting the first exclusion limits on dark hadrons in that channel.
- Dark photons: Lighter mediators that could bridge the Standard Model and the dark sector. Experiments like the FASER experiment and dedicated low-mass triggers at CMS have searched for these in the 2–8 GeV mass range, constraining the mixing parameters between dark and ordinary photons.

While the LHC has not yet produced direct evidence of dark matter, the constraints established by the ATLAS and CMS collaborations have been crucial in narrowing their parameter spaces, closing the door on many WIMP models and redirecting future searches toward lighter, more elusive candidates or multi-TeV scales accessible only by future colliders like the Future Circular Collider.

== Alternative hypotheses ==
=== Modified gravity ===
If dark matter is not an undiscovered particle, then the next possibility is that general relativity, the theory underpinning modern cosmology, is incorrect. General relativity is well-tested on Solar System scales, but its validity on galactic or cosmological scales has not been well proven. A suitable modification to general relativity can conceivably eliminate the need for dark matter. The best-known theories of this class are modified Newtonian dynamics (MOND) and its relativistic generalization tensor–vector–scalar gravity (TeVeS), f(R) gravity, negative mass, dark fluid, entropic gravity, conformal gravity, and massive gravity. Alternative theories abound.

A problem with modifying gravity is that observational evidence for dark matter – let alone general relativity – comes from so many independent approaches (see § Observational evidence above). Explaining any individual observation is possible but explaining all of them in the absence of dark matter is very difficult. Nonetheless, there have been some scattered successes for alternative hypotheses, such as a 2016 test of gravitational lensing in entropic gravity and a 2020 measurement of a unique MOND effect. The prevailing opinion among most astrophysicists is that while modifications to general relativity can conceivably explain part of the observational evidence, there is probably enough data to conclude there must be some form of dark matter present in the universe.

=== Non-mainstream and less established particle, field, and structure theories ===
While WIMPs, axions, and primordial black holes remain the primary candidates for dark matter, numerous other theories have been proposed to address specific observational anomalies or theoretical motivations. These alternative models often explore mass ranges and interaction strengths outside the standard parameter space, ranging from ultra-light scalar fields to massive composite states. Some hypotheses posit the existence of complex "dark sectors" with their own fundamental forces, while others suggest that dark matter may be unstable, dynamical, or composed of mirror particles. The following list encompasses these less established but theoretically motivated candidates and frameworks.

- Chameleon particle – Hypothetical scalar particle that couples to matter more weakly than gravity
- Dark galaxy – Hypothesized galaxy with no, or very few, stars
- Dark radiation – Postulated type of radiation that mediates interactions of dark matter
- Density wave theory – A theory in which waves of compressed gas, which move slower than the galaxy, maintain galaxies' structure
- Dynamical dark matter
- Exotic matter – Physics term for multiple concepts
- Feebly interacting particles
- Light dark matter – Dark matter weakly interacting massive particles candidates with masses less than 1 GeV
- Mirror matter – Hypothetical counterpart to ordinary matter
- Neutralino – Neutral mass eigenstate formed from superpartners of gauge and Higgs bosons
- Scalar field dark matter – Conjectured dark matter in cosmology
- Strongly interacting massive particle (SIMP) – Hypothetical particle
- Weakly interacting slim particle (WISP) – Low-mass counterpart to WIMP

== In popular culture ==
Dark matter regularly appears as a topic in hybrid periodicals that cover both factual scientific topics and science fiction, and dark matter itself has been referred to as "the stuff of science fiction".

Mention of dark matter is made in works of fiction. In such cases, it is usually attributed extraordinary physical or magical properties, thus becoming inconsistent with the hypothesized properties of dark matter in physics and cosmology. For example:

- Dark matter serves as a plot device in the 1995 X-Files episode "Soft Light".
- A dark-matter-inspired substance known as "Dust" features prominently in Philip Pullman's His Dark Materials trilogy.
- Beings made of dark matter are antagonists in Stephen Baxter's Xeelee Sequence.

More broadly, the phrase "dark matter" is used metaphorically in fiction to evoke the unseen or invisible.

== Gallery ==
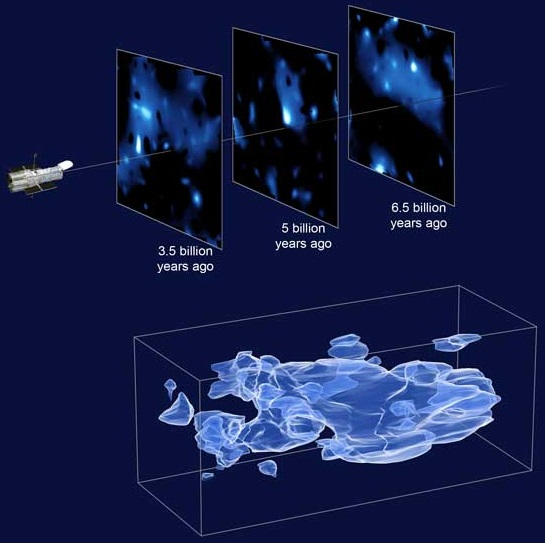
Dark matter map by the Cosmic Evolution Survey (COSMOS) using the Hubble Space Telescope (2007)

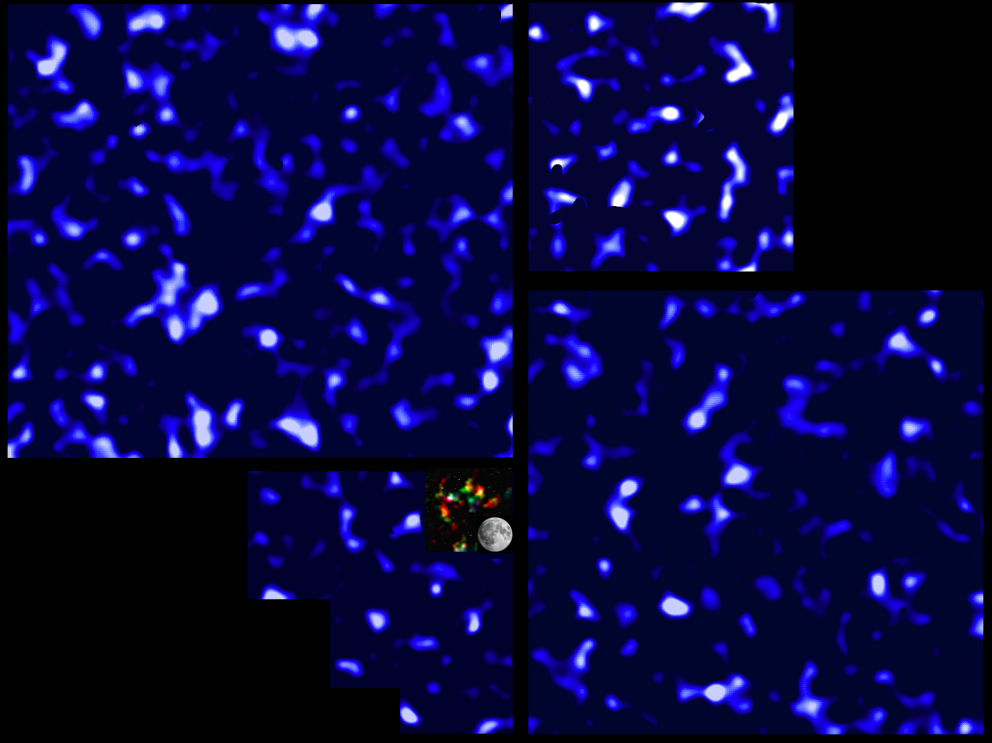
Dark matter map by the CFHT Lensing Survey (CFHTLenS) using the Canada–France–Hawaii Telescope (2012) (COSMOS map at the center)

Dark matter map by the Kilo-Degree Survey (KiDS) using the VLT Survey Telescope (2015)

Dark matter map by the Hyper Suprime-Cam Survey (HSCS) using the Subaru Telescope (2018)

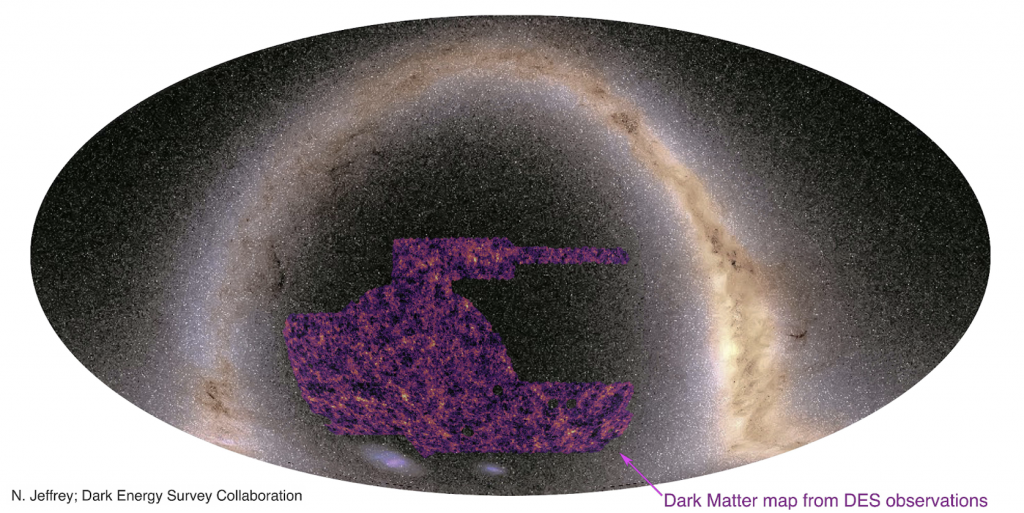
Dark matter map by the Dark Energy Survey (DES) using the Víctor M. Blanco Telescope (2021)

== See also ==
Related theories

- Dark energy – Energy driving the accelerated expansion of the universe
- Unparticle physics – Speculative theory of non-particle matter

Experiments

- DEAP – Dark matter search experiment, a search apparatus
- Dark Matter Particle Explorer (DAMPE) – Chinese science satellite
- General antiparticle spectrometer – NASA experimental high-altitude balloon
- MultiDark, a research program
- Illustris project – Computer-simulated universes, astrophysical simulations

Other

- Galactic Center GeV excess – Unexplained gamma rays from the Galactic Center
- Luminiferous aether – A once theorized invisible and infinite material with no interaction with physical objects, used to explain how light could travel through a vacuum (now disproven)
