= Daniel Akerib =

American physicist

Daniel S. Akerib
- Born: June 19, 1962
- Education: University of Chicago; Princeton University
- Known for: Dark Matter detection experiments (CDMS, LUX, LUX-ZEPLIN), WIMP search, Detector development, Xenon purification, CMB-S4 experiment involvement
- Spouse: Chantal Christ
- Awards: Fellow of the American Physical Society (APS) (2008)
- Scientific career
- Fields: Particle physics, Astrophysics
- Institutions: SLAC National Accelerator Laboratory; Stanford University; Case Western Reserve University; California Institute of Technology, UC Berkeley's Center for Particle Astrophysics
- Thesis: A search for the rare decay K+ → π+ νν (1990)

Daniel S. Akerib (born June 19, 1962) is an American particle physicist and astrophysicist. He was elected in 2008 a fellow of the American Physical Society (APS).

== Biography ==
Akerib graduated in 1984 with an A.B. from the University of Chicago and in 1990 with a Ph.D. in physics from Princeton University. A search for the rare decay K^{+} → π^{+}νν̅ is the title of his Ph.D. thesis (which finds experimental limits for a particular type of rare decay involving kaons). As a postdoc he did research from 1990 to 1992 at California Institute of Technology and from 1993 to 1996 at UC Berkeley's Center for Particle Astrophysics (which was started in 1989 with funding from the National Science Foundation). In the physics department of Case Western Reserve University, he was from 1995 to 2001 an assistant professor, from 2001 to 2004 an associate professor, and from 2004 to 2014 a full professor. He also chaired the department from 2007 to 2010. Akerib has been a professor of particle physics and astrophysics at SLAC National Accelerator Laboratory since 2014, with a courtesy full-time professorship in Stanford University's physics department.

Akerib was involved for about two years (from 2019 to 2020) in the CMB-Stage 4 (CMB-S4) experiment to detect primordial gravitational waves and to gather data about the early universe but is no longer involved.

At Case Western Reserve University from 2008 to 2014, he worked with Thomas A. Shutt on the Large Underground Xenon (LUX) experiment to detect dark matter particles. In 2014 both were appointed to professorships at SLAC National Accelerator Laboratory and Stanford University. The two became the leaders of the SLAC establishment of a Liquid Nobles Test Platform. Their group "specializes in detector development, xenon purification, and simulations".

Akerib's 2008 APS fellowship citation is for "significant contributions to direct Dark Matter detection experiments, in particular for his work on the CDMS experiment."

Since the 1990s he has done research on the search for WIMPs, beginning with the Cryogenic Dark Matter Search and in recent years with the Large Underground Xenon experiment and the LUX-ZEPLIN Experiment. He now works on expanding and improving time projection chambers to improve sensitivity for possible detection of WIMPs. Such chambers use liquid xenon as a target medium.

On May 31, 1992, in Lodi, New York, he married Chantal Christ.

== Selected publications ==
- Ammar, R.; et al. (1993). "Evidence for penguin-diagram decays: First observation of B→K*(892)γ". Physical Review Letters. 71 (5): 674–678. doi:10.1103/PhysRevLett.71.674. hdl:1808/1476. PMID 10055338. (over 850 citations)
- Alam, M. S.; et al. (1994). "Exclusive hadronic B decays to charm and charmonium final states". Physical Review D. 50 (1): 43–68. arXiv:hep-ph/9403295. Bibcode:1994PhRvD..50...43A. doi:10.1103/PhysRevD.50.43. PMID 10017512. S2CID 2799720.
- Akerib, D. S.; et al. (2003). "New results from the Cryogenic Dark Matter Search experiment". Physical Review D. 68 (8) 082002. arXiv:hep-ex/0306001. Bibcode:2003PhRvD..68h2002A. doi:10.1103/PhysRevD.68.082002. S2CID 116987929.
- Akerib, D. S.; et al. (2004). "First Results from the Cryogenic Dark Matter Search in the Soudan Underground Laboratory". Physical Review Letters. 93 (21) 211301. arXiv:astro-ph/0405033. Bibcode:2004PhRvL..93u1301A. doi:10.1103/PhysRevLett.93.211301. PMID 15600991. S2CID 119045944.
- Ahmed, Z.; et al. (2009). "Search for Weakly Interacting Massive Particles with the First Five-Tower Data from the Cryogenic Dark Matter Search at the Soudan Underground Laboratory". Physical Review Letters. 102 (1) 011301. arXiv:0802.3530. Bibcode:2009PhRvL.102a1301A. doi:10.1103/PhysRevLett.102.011301. PMID 19257177. S2CID 1767124. (over 600 citations)
- CDMS II Collaboration; et al. (2010). "Dark Matter Search Results from the CDMS II Experiment". Science. 327 (5973): 1619–1621. arXiv:0912.3592. Bibcode:2010Sci...327.1619C. doi:10.1126/science.1186112. PMID 20150446. S2CID 53365634. (over 900 citations)
- Ahmed, Z.; et al. (2011). "Results from a Low-Energy Analysis of the CDMS II Germanium Data". Physical Review Letters. 106 (13) 131302. arXiv:1011.2482. Bibcode:2011PhRvL.106m1302A. doi:10.1103/PhysRevLett.106.131302. PMID 21517371. S2CID 9879642. 2011 (over 650 citations)
- Malling, D. C.; et al. (2011). "After LUX: The LZ Program". arXiv:1110.0103 [astro-ph.IM].
- Akerib, D.S.; et al. (2013). "The Large Underground Xenon (LUX) experiment". Nuclear Instruments and Methods in Physics Research Section A: Accelerators, Spectrometers, Detectors and Associated Equipment. 704: 111–126. arXiv:1211.3788. Bibcode:2013NIMPA.704..111A. doi:10.1016/j.nima.2012.11.135. S2CID 67768071.
- Akerib, D. S.; et al. (2014). "First Results from the LUX Dark Matter Experiment at the Sanford Underground Research Facility". Physical Review Letters. 112 (9) 091303. arXiv:1310.8214. Bibcode:2014PhRvL.112i1303A. doi:10.1103/PhysRevLett.112.091303. PMID 24655239. S2CID 2161650. (over 2150 citations)
- Akerib, D. S.; et al. (2016). "Improved Limits on Scattering of Weakly Interacting Massive Particles from Reanalysis of 2013 LUX Data". Physical Review Letters. 116 (16) 161301. arXiv:1512.03506. Bibcode:2016PhRvL.116p1301A. doi:10.1103/PhysRevLett.116.161301. PMID 27152785. S2CID 6139502. (over 500 citations)
- Akerib, D. S.; et al. (2017). "Results from a Search for Dark Matter in the Complete LUX Exposure". Physical Review Letters. 118 (2) 021303. arXiv:1608.07648. Bibcode:2017PhRvL.118b1303A. doi:10.1103/PhysRevLett.118.021303. PMID 28128598. S2CID 206284055. (over 1950 citations)
- Mount, B. J.; et al. (2017). "LUX-ZEPLIN (LZ) Technical Design Report". arXiv:1703.09144 [physics.ins-det].
- Akerib, D. S.; et al. (2020). "Projected WIMP sensitivity of the LUX-ZEPLIN dark matter experiment". Physical Review D. 101 (5) 052002. arXiv:1802.06039. Bibcode:2020PhRvD.101e2002A. doi:10.1103/PhysRevD.101.052002. S2CID 55406755.
- Akerib, D.S.; et al. (2020). "The LUX-ZEPLIN (LZ) experiment". Nuclear Instruments and Methods in Physics Research Section A: Accelerators, Spectrometers, Detectors and Associated Equipment. 953 163047. arXiv:1910.09124. Bibcode:2020NIMPA.95363047A. doi:10.1016/j.nima.2019.163047. S2CID 204800748.
