= XENON =

Dark matter research project

Coordinates: 42°25′14″N 13°30′59″E

The XENON dark matter research project, operated at the Italian Gran Sasso National Laboratory, is a deep underground detector facility featuring increasingly ambitious experiments aiming to detect hypothetical dark matter particles. The experiments aim to detect particles in the form of weakly interacting massive particles (WIMPs) by looking for rare nuclear recoil interactions in a liquid xenon target chamber. The current detector consists of a dual phase time projection chamber (TPC).

The experiment detects scintillation and ionization signals produced when external particles interact in the liquid xenon volume, to search for an excess of nuclear recoil events against known backgrounds. The detection of such a signal would provide the first direct experimental evidence for dark matter candidate particles. The collaboration is currently led by Italian professor of physics Elena Aprile from Columbia University.

== Detector principle ==
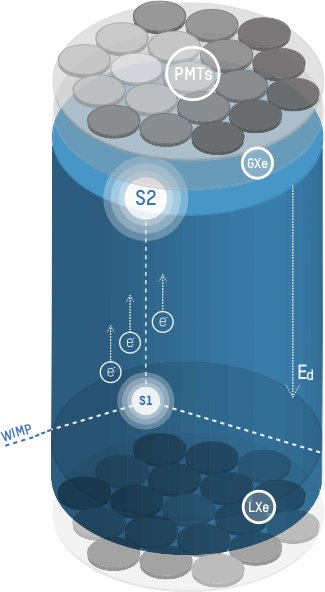
Sketch of the working principle of a xenon dual-phase TPC

The XENON experiment operates a dual phase time projection chamber (TPC), which utilizes a liquid xenon target with a gaseous phase on top. Two arrays of photomultiplier tubes (PMTs), one at the top of the detector in the gaseous phase (GXe), and one at the bottom of the liquid layer (LXe), detect scintillation and electroluminescence light produced when charged particles interact in the detector. Electric fields are applied across both the liquid and gaseous phase of the detector. The electric field in the gaseous phase has to be sufficiently large to extract electrons from the liquid phase.

Particle interactions in the liquid target produce scintillation and ionization. The prompt scintillation light produces 178 nm ultraviolet photons. This signal is detected by the PMTs, and is referred to as the S1 signal. The applied electric field prevents recombination of all the electrons produced from a charged particle interaction in the TPC. These electrons are drifted to the top of the liquid phase by the electric field. The ionization is then extracted into the gas phase by the stronger electric field in the gaseous phase. The electric field accelerates the electrons to the point that it creates a proportional scintillation signal that is also collected by the PMTs, and is referred to as the S2 signal. This technique has proved sensitive enough to detect S2 signals generated from single electrons.

The detector allows for a full 3-D position determination of the particle interaction. Electrons in liquid xenon have a uniform drift velocity. This allows the interaction depth of the event to be determined by measuring the time delay between the S1 and S2 signal. The position of the event in the x-y plane can be determined by looking at the number of photons seen by each of the individual PMTs. The full 3-D position allows for the fiducialization of the detector, in which a low-background region is defined in the inner volume of the TPC. This fiducial volume has a greatly reduced rate of background events as compared to regions of the detector at the edge of the TPC, due to the self-shielding properties of liquid xenon. This allows for a much higher sensitivity when searching for very rare events.

Charged particles moving through the detector are expected to either interact with the electrons of the xenon atoms producing electronic recoils, or with the nucleus, producing nuclear recoils. For a given amount of energy deposited by a particle interaction in the detector, the ratio of S2/S1 can be used as a discrimination parameter to distinguish electronic and nuclear recoil events. This ratio is expected to be greater for electronic recoils than for nuclear recoils. In this way backgrounds from electronic recoils can be suppressed by more than 99%, while simultaneously retaining 50% of the nuclear recoil events.

== XENON10 ==
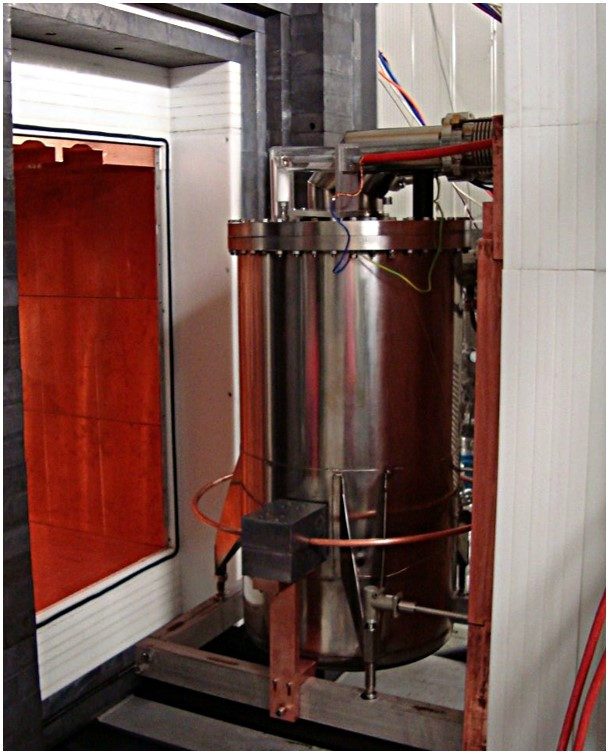
The cryostat and shield of XENON100. The shield consists of an outer layer of 20 cm of water, a 20 cm layer of lead, a 20 cm layer of polyethylene, and on the interior a 5 cm copper layer. The lead is sourced from ingots carried by ancient Roman shipwrecks, which have a much lower incidence of radioisotopes than freshly smelted lead.

The XENON10 experiment was installed at the underground Gran Sasso laboratory in Italy during March 2006. The underground location of the laboratory provides 3100 m of water-equivalent shielding. The detector was placed within a shield to further reduce the background rate in the TPC. XENON10 was intended as a prototype detector, to prove the efficacy of the XENON design, as well as verify the achievable threshold, background rejection power and sensitivity. The XENON10 detector contained 15 kg of liquid xenon. The sensitive volume of the TPC measures 20 cm in diameter and 15 cm in height.

An analysis of 59 live days of data, taken between October 2006 and February 2007, produced no WIMP signatures. The number of events observed in the WIMP search region is statistically consistent with the expected number of events from electronic recoil backgrounds. This result excluded some of the available parameter space in minimal Supersymmetric models, by placing limits on spin independent WIMP-nucleon cross sections down to below 10×10^{−43} cm^{2} for a 30 GeV/c^{2} WIMP mass.

Due to nearly half of natural xenon having odd spin states (^{129}Xe has an abundance of 26% and spin-1/2; ^{131}Xe has an abundance of 21% and spin-3/2), the XENON detectors can also be used to provide limits on spin dependent WIMP-nucleon cross sections for coupling of the dark matter candidate particle to both neutrons and protons. XENON10 set the world's most stringent restrictions on pure neutron coupling.

== XENON100 ==
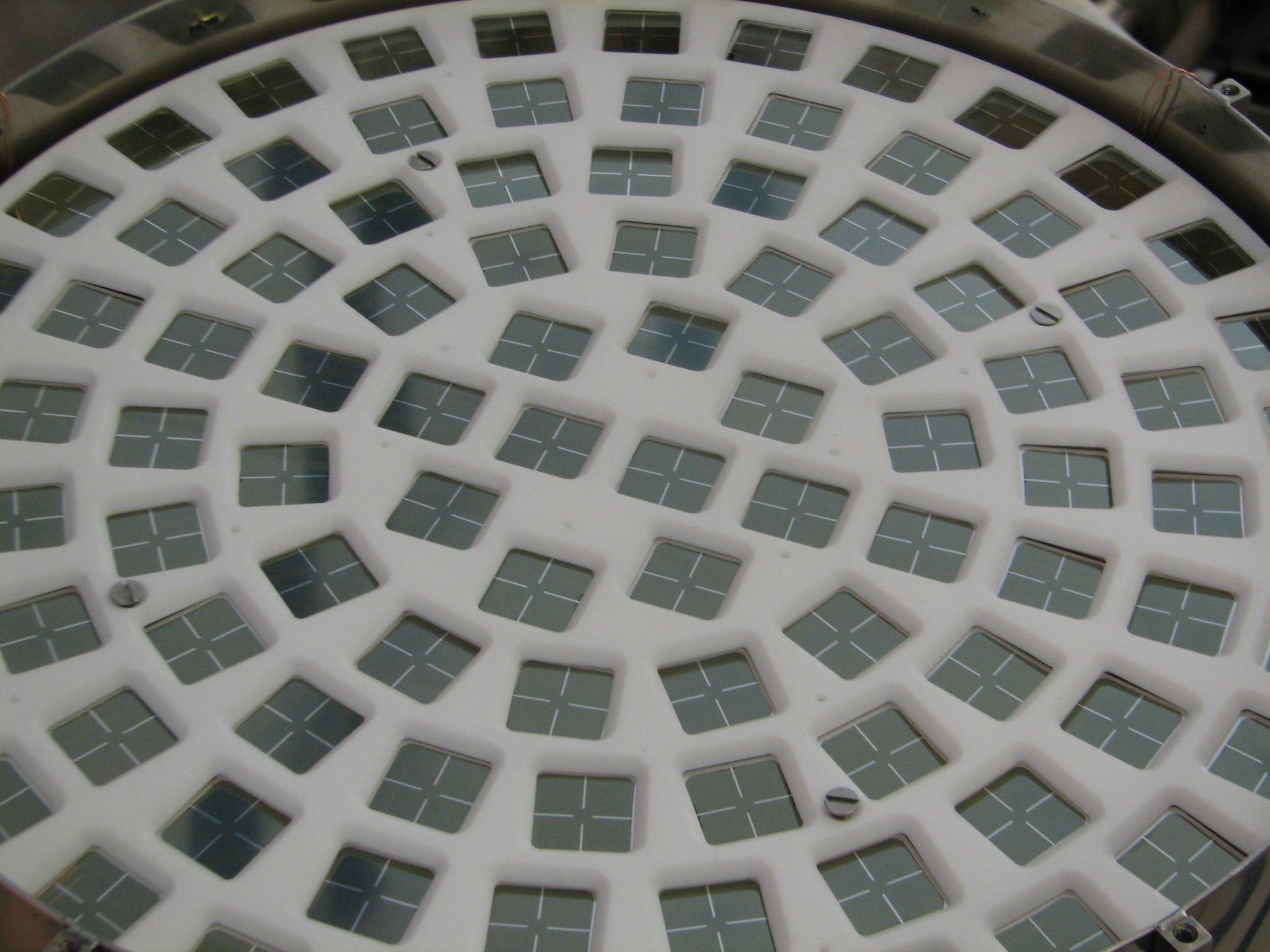
The top PMT array of XENON100 contains 98 Hamamatsu R8520-06-A1 PMTs. The PMTs on the top array are placed in concentric circles to improve the reconstruction of the radial position of observed events.

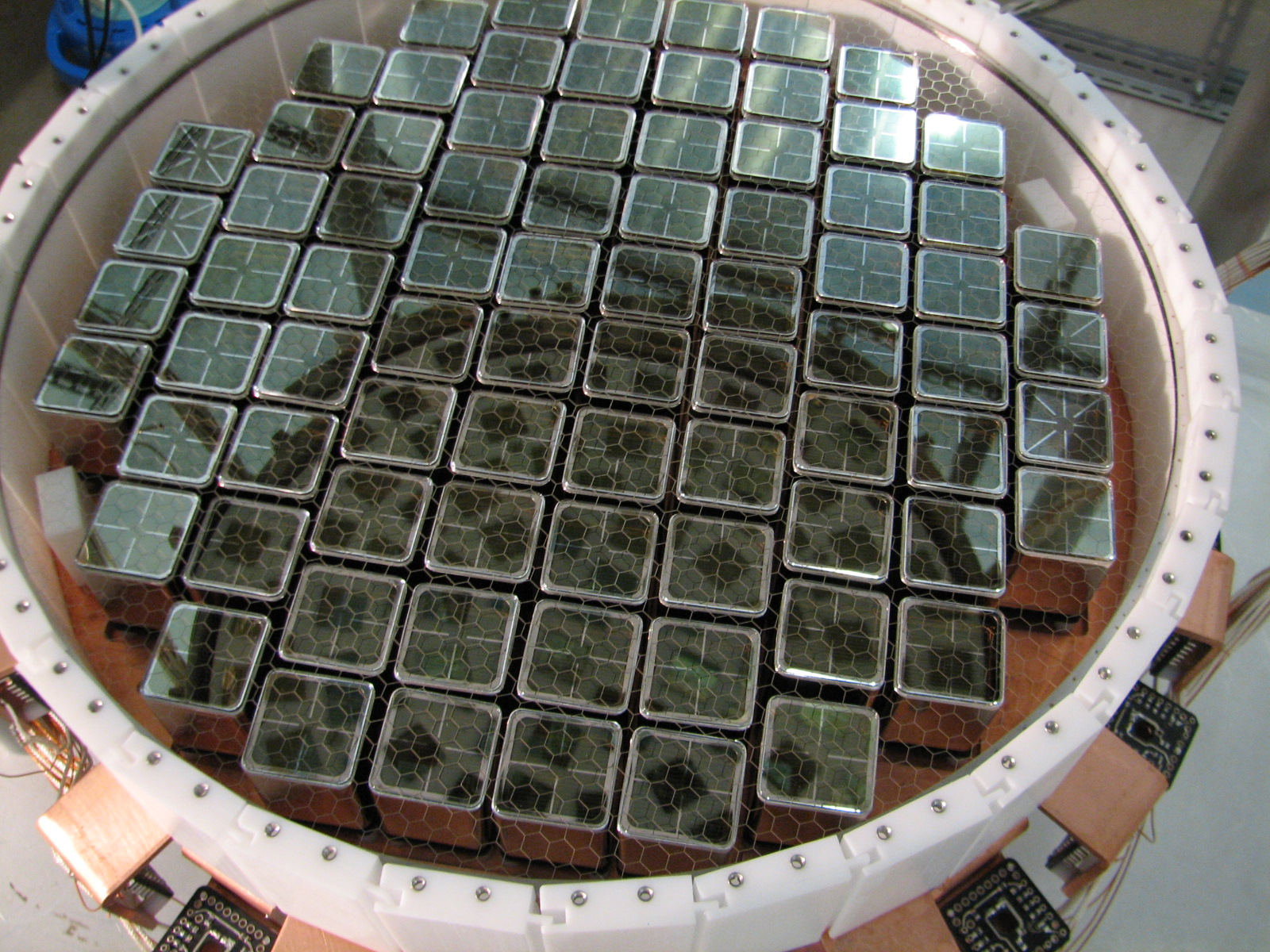
The bottom PMT array of XENON100 contains 80 PMTs which are spaced as closely as possible in order to maximize light collection efficiency.

The second phase detector, XENON100, contains 165 kg of liquid xenon, with 62 kg in the target region and the remaining xenon in an active veto. The TPC of the detector has a diameter of 30 cm and a height of 30 cm. As WIMP interactions are expected to be extremely rare events, a thorough campaign was launched during the construction and commissioning phase of XENON100 to screen all parts of the detector for radioactivity. The screening was performed using high-purity Germanium detectors. In a few cases mass spectrometry was performed on low mass plastic samples. In doing so the design goal of <10^{−2} events/kg/day/keV was reached, realising the world's lowest background rate dark matter detector.

The detector was installed at the Gran Sasso National Laboratory in 2008 in the same shield as the XENON10 detector, and has conducted several science runs. In each science run, no dark matter signal was observed above the expected background, leading to the most stringent limit on the spin independent WIMP-nucleon cross section in 2012, with a minimum at 2.0×10^{−45} cm^{2} for a 65 GeV/c^{2} WIMP mass. These results constrain interpretations of signals in other experiments as dark matter interactions, and rule out exotic models such as inelastic dark matter, which would resolve this discrepancy. XENON100 has also provided improved limits on the spin dependent WIMP-nucleon cross section. An axion result was published in 2014, setting a new best axion limit.

XENON100 operated the then-lowest background experiment, for dark matter searches, with a background of 50 mDRU (1 mDRU=10^{−3} events/kg/day/keV).

== XENON1T ==
Construction of the next phase, XENON1T, started in Hall B of the Gran Sasso National Laboratory in 2014. The detector contains 3.2 tons of ultra radio-pure liquid xenon, and has a fiducial volume of about 2 tons. The detector is housed in a 10 m water tank that serves as a muon veto. The TPC is 1 m in diameter and 1 m in height.

The detector project team, called the XENON Collaboration, is composed of 135 investigators across 22 institutions from Europe, the Middle East, and the United States.

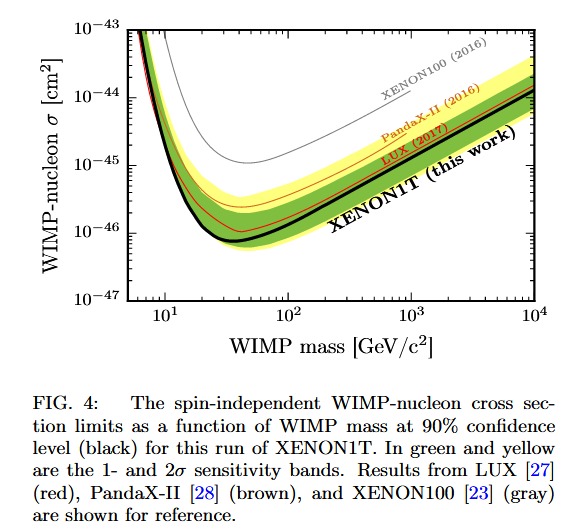
Upper limit for spin-independent WIMP-nucleon cross section according to recent data (published in November 2017)

The first results from XENON1T were released by the XENON collaboration on May 18, 2017, based on 34 days of data-taking between November 2016 and January 2017. While no WIMPs or dark matter candidate signals were officially detected, the team did announce a record low reduction in the background radioactivity levels being picked up by XENON1T. The exclusion limits exceeded the previous best limits set by the LUX experiment, with an exclusion of cross sections larger than 7.7×10^{−47} cm^{2} for WIMP masses of 35 GeV/c^{2}. Because some signals that the detector receives might be due to neutrons, reducing the radioactivity increases the sensitivity to WIMPs.

In September 2018 the XENON1T experiment published its results from 278.8 days of collected data. A new record limit for WIMP-nucleon spin-independent elastic interactions was set, with a minimum of 4.1×10^{−47} cm^{2} at a WIMP mass of 30 GeV/c^{2}.

In April 2019, based on measurements performed with the XENON1T detector, the XENON Collaboration reported in Nature the first direct observation of two-neutrino double electron capture in xenon-124 nuclei. The measured half-life of this process, which is several orders of magnitude larger than the age of the Universe, demonstrates the capabilities of xenon-based detectors to search for rare events and showcases the broad physics reach of even larger next-generation experiments. This measurement represents a first step in the search for the neutrinoless double electron capture process, the detection of which would provide insight into the nature of the neutrino and allow to determine its absolute mass.

As of 2019, the XENON1T experiment has stopped data-taking to allow for construction of the next phase, XENONnT. The XENON1T detector operated 2016–2018, with the detector operations ending at the end of 2018.

In June 2020, the XENON1T collaboration reported an excess of electron recoils: 285 events, 53 more than the expected 232 with a statistical significance of 3.5σ. Three explanations were considered: existence of to-date-hypothetical solar axions, a surprisingly large magnetic moment for neutrinos, and tritium contamination in the detector. Multiple other explanations were given later by others groups and in 2021 an interpretation of the results not as dark matter particles but of as dark energy particles candidates called chameleons has also been discussed. In July 2022 a new analysis by XENONnT discarded the excess.

== XENONnT ==
XENONnT is an upgrade of the XENON1T experiment underground at LNGS. Its systems will contain a total xenon mass of more than 8 tonnes. Apart from a larger xenon target in its time projection chamber the upgraded experiment will feature new components to further reduce or tag radiation that otherwise would constitute background to its measurements. It is designed to reach a sensitivity (in a small part of the mass-range probed) where neutrinos become a significant background. As of 2019, the upgrade was on-going and first light was expected in 2020.

The XENONnT detector was under construction in March 2020. Even with the problems posed by COVID-19, the project was able to finish construction and move forwards into commissioning phase by mid 2020. Full detector operations commenced in late 2020. In September 2021, XENONnT was taking science data for its first science run, which was ongoing at the time.

On July 28, 2023, the XENONnT published the first results of its search for WIMPs, excluding cross sections above 2.58×10^{−47} cm^{2} at 28 GeV with 90% confidence level, jointly on the same date the LZ experiment published its first results too excluding cross sections above 9.2×10^{−48} cm^{2} at 36 GeV with 90% confidence level. Further results from XENONnT published on July 30, 2026, exclude cross sections above 6.0×10^{−45} cm^{2} at 5 GeV.
