= Daniel McKinsey =

American dark matter researcher

Daniel Nicholas McKinsey
- Education: B.S. in Physics (University of Michigan), Ph.D. (Harvard University)
- Alma mater: University of Michigan, Harvard University
- Occupation: Experimental Physicist
- Employer(s): University of California, Berkeley
- Known for: Direct searches for dark matter interactions
- Awards: Packard Fellowship in Science and Engineering Fellowship, Alfred P. Sloan Research Fellowship

Daniel Nicholas McKinsey is an American experimental physicist. McKinsey is a leader in the field of direct searches for dark matter interactions, and serves as Co-Spokesperson of the Large Underground Xenon experiment. and is an executive committee member of the LUX-ZEPLIN experiment. He serves as Director and Principal Investigator of the TESSERACT Project, and is also The Georgia Lee Distinguished Professor of Physics at the University of California, Berkeley.

== Biography ==
Daniel N. McKinsey joined the University of California, Berkeley Physics Department faculty in July 2015. He received a B.S. in Physics with highest honors at the University of Michigan in 1995. His Ph.D. was awarded by Harvard University in 2002, with a thesis on the magnetic trapping, storage, and detection of ultracold neutrons in superfluid helium. His postdoctoral research was performed at Princeton University, and in 2003 he joined the Yale University physics department, where he was promoted to Full Professor in 2014. He was awarded a Packard Fellowship in Science and Engineering Fellowship and an Alfred P. Sloan Research Fellowship, and served on the 2013-2014 Particle Physics Project Prioritization Panel (P5).

== Research interests ==
McKinsey's research centers on non-accelerator particle physics, particle astrophysics, and low temperature physics. In particular, his work is on the development, construction, and operation of new detectors using liquefied noble gases, which are useful in looking for physics beyond the Standard Model. Applications include the search for dark matter interactions with ordinary matter, searches for neutrinoless double beta decay, and the measurement of the low energy solar neutrino flux. He is especially interested in the physics of the response of liquefied noble gases to particle interactions, the calibration of these detectors so as to understand their response, and the overall development of new experimental techniques for reaching sensitivity to extremely rare, low-energy particle interactions. Other interests include the use of liquid xenon for gamma-ray imaging, and the visualization of turbulence in superfluid helium
