= Alex Murphy =

Alex or Alexander Murphy may refer to:

- Alex Murphy (actor), Irish actor
- Alex Murphy (footballer) (born 2004), Irish footballer playing for Newcastle United F.C.
- Alex Murphy (basketball) (born 1993), American college basketball player
- Alex Murphy (figure skater)
- Alex Murphy (academic)
- Alex Murphy (rugby league) (born 1939), English rugby league footballer and coach
- Alex Murphy (Shortland Street), a fictional character on the New Zealand soap opera
- Alex James Murphy, the human name of RoboCop
- Alex Murphy, one of the perpetrators of the Corporals killings
- Alexander Murphy farm, the location of John Brown's Fort
