= Alex Murphy (academic) =

British astrophysicist

Alex Murphy FRSE, FInstP, FRAS
- Education: University of Birmingham
- Known for: Direct detection of dark matter, ZEPLIN-III, LUX, LUX–ZEPLIN (LZ), core-collapse supernovae
- Awards: British Science Association Lord Kelvin Award Lecture (2009); Fellow of the Royal Society of Edinburgh (2021); Royal Society of Edinburgh Senior Public Engagement Medal (2021)
- Scientific career
- Fields: Astroparticle physics, Nuclear astrophysics
- Workplaces: Ohio State University; University of Edinburgh
- Doctoral advisor: Brian Fulton

Alex Murphy FRSE is a British nuclear and particle astrophysicist and a professor at the University of Edinburgh. His research includes the direct detection of dark matter and nuclear astrophysics, specifically the study of explosive stellar events.

== Early life and education ==
Murphy obtained both his undergraduate and graduate degrees in physics from the University of Birmingham. He earned his doctorate in experimental nuclear physics under the supervision of Brian Fulton.

== Career ==
After completing his doctorate, Murphy conducted postdoctoral research at Ohio State University in the United States. His work there included the design of a supernova neutrino observatory and studies to determine astrophysical nuclear reaction rates, with contributions to the proposed OMNIS (Observatory for Multiflavor Neutrinos from Supernovae) experiment.

Murphy returned to the United Kingdom in 2001 and joined the faculty of the University of Edinburgh as a lecturer. In 2009, he became a Reader and later he was appointed Professor of Nuclear & Particle Astrophysics. In 2014, he became the Chair of Nuclear and Particle Astrophysics.

In 2015, Murphy chaired a review of UK astroparticle physics research for the Institute of Physics.

In 2021, Murphy served as a member of subpanel 9 (Physics) in the Research Excellence Framework.

== Research ==
Murphy's research is concentrated in two primary areas: dark matter detection and nuclear astrophysics.

In dark matter research, he has participated in several international experiments. He led the University of Edinburgh's contribution to the ZEPLIN-III dark matter experiment, located in an underground laboratory in England, which searched for Weakly Interacting Massive Particle (WIMP) interactions. Subsequently, he and his research group joined the Large Underground Xenon (LUX) experiment and its successor, LUX-ZEPLIN (LZ). At Edinburgh, Murphy co-leads a research group working on the LZ detector, which operates underground in South Dakota. His team's contributions to LZ include research on background neutrons and searches for alternative dark matter candidates, such as axions.

In nuclear astrophysics, Murphy investigates the nuclear processes in stellar explosions and element formation. He leads an experimental program at CERN to measure nuclear reaction rates relevant to core-collapse supernovae. The project involves using radioactive isotopes, extracted in collaboration with the Paul Scherrer Institute, as targets in a particle beam to simulate conditions within a supernova. The analysis of reaction outcomes is used to study element formation. Murphy publishes on topics including stellar evolution simulations and experimental nuclear reaction data.

== Awards and honours ==
Murphy was awarded the Lord Kelvin Award in Physics and Mathematics by the British Science Association in 2009. He was elected a Fellow of the Royal Society of Edinburgh (FRSE) in 2021. In the same year, he received the Senior Public Engagement Medal from the Royal Society of Edinburgh. He is also a Fellow of the Institute of Physics (FInstP) and a Fellow of the Royal Astronomical Society (FRAS).
