= Gold Run =

Gold Run may refer to:

== Communities ==
- Gold Run, California, a former settlement in Placer County, California, U.S.
- Gold Run, Yukon, a locality in Yukon Territory, Canada

== Other uses ==
- Gold Run (South Dakota), a stream in South Dakota, U.S.
- Gold Run, an element of game play on the game show Blockbusters
- Gold Run, a 2022 Norwegian film about the Flight of the Norwegian National Treasury
- Gold run, an alternate term for a bank run

== See also ==
- Gold rush, a discovery of gold that brings an onrush of miners seeking their fortune
- Alexander Goldrun, a Thoroughbred racehorse born in Ireland in 2001
