= Sanford Underground Research Facility =

Underground laboratory in Lead, South Dakota

Coordinates: 44.352°N 103.751°W

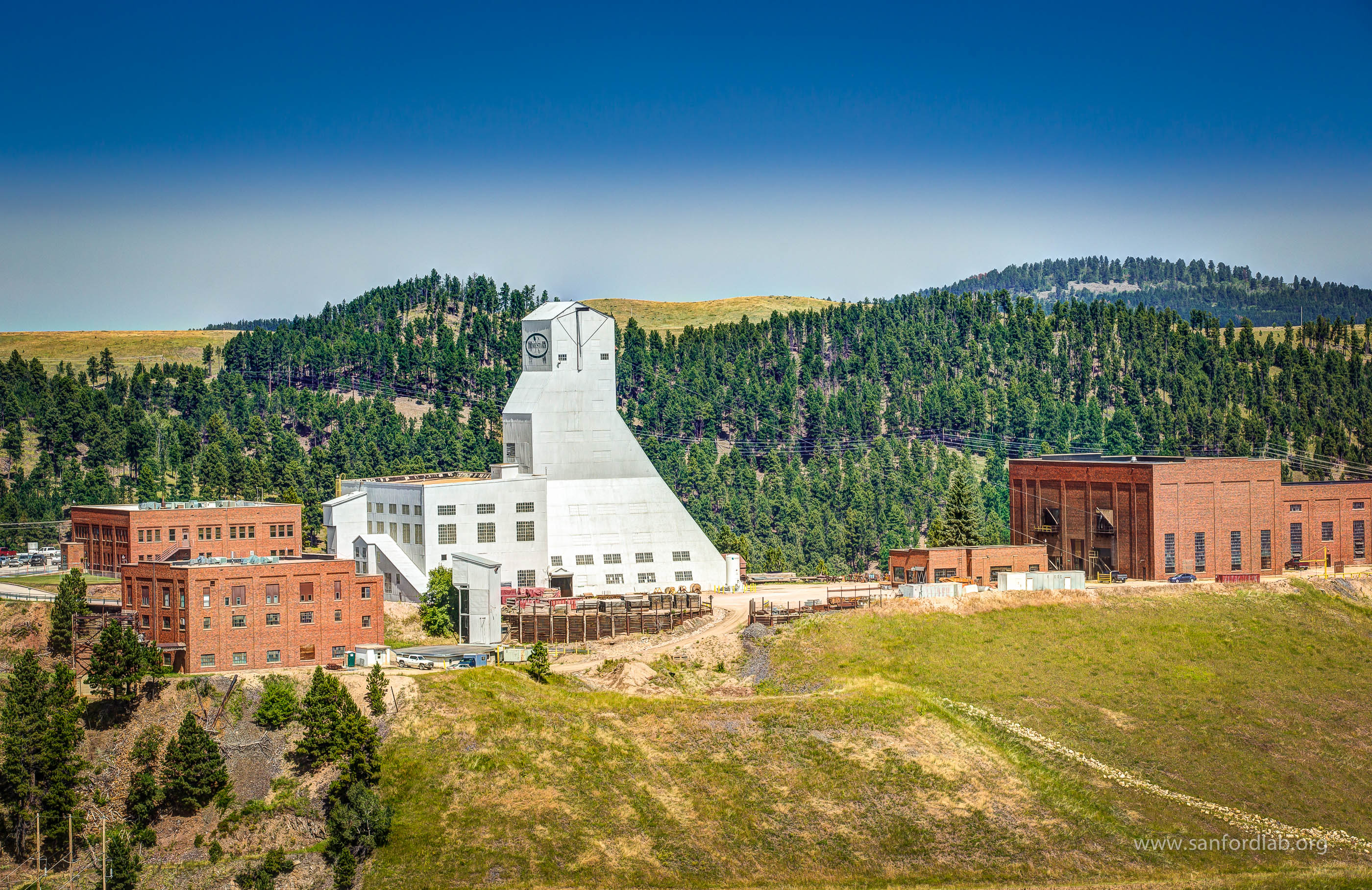
Sanford Underground Research Facility's Yates Headframe

The Sanford Underground Research Facility (SURF), or Sanford Lab, is an underground laboratory in Lead, South Dakota. The deepest underground laboratory in the United States, it houses multiple experiments in areas such as dark matter and neutrino physics research, biology, geology and engineering. There are currently 28 active research projects housed within the facility.

Sanford Lab is managed by the South Dakota Science and Technology Authority (SDSTA). SURF operations are funded by the U.S. Department of Energy through Fermi National Accelerator Laboratory and through a $70M donation from T. Denny Sanford. The State of South Dakota also contributed nearly $70 million to the project.

== Scientific Research ==
Sanford Lab's depth, rock stability and history make it ideal for sensitive physics experiments that need to escape high energy cosmic radiation from the sun. Additionally, the facility is used for researchers studying geology, biology and engineering.

=== Experiments ===
==== Under development ====
DUNE, LBNF/hosted by Fermilab: Scientists with the Deep Underground Neutrino Experiment (DUNE) hope to revolutionize our understanding of the role neutrinos play in the creation of the universe. The Long-Baseline Neutrino Facility (LBNF) will shoot a beam of neutrinos from Fermilab in Batavia, Illinois, 800 miles (1,300 km) through the earth to detectors deep underground at Sanford Lab in Lead, South Dakota.

==== Active ====
LUX-Zeplin: LUX-ZEPLIN (LZ) is a next-generation dark matter detector that replaced the LUX experiment deep underground at Sanford Lab. The experiment continues the search for WIMPs (Weakly Interacting Massive Particles) using a detector that is 30 times larger and 100 times more sensitive than LUX.

CASPAR: The Compact Accelerator System for Performing Astrophysical Research (CASPAR) collaboration uses a low-energy accelerator (50-foot-long (15 m)) to better understand how chemical elements are produced in the Universe and at what rate and how much energy is produced during the process. The construction of the accelerator begun around 2015 and achieved first beam in 2017. In spring of 2021, the CASPAR experiment was mothballed due to excavations starting nearby. The accelerator was disassembled and put into storage. The research group plans to return to SURF in the future.

Majorana Demonstrator: The Majorana Demonstrator uses 40 kilograms (88 lb) of pure germanium crystals enclosed in deep-freeze cryostat modules to determine if neutrinos are their own antiparticles. Additionally, evidence supporting this possibility could fundamentally reshape the Standard Model of Particles and Interactions.

CUSSP: Center for Understanding Subsurface Signals and Permeability seeks to improve energy recovery from geothermal sites by better understanding how to induce fractures in geothermal reservoirs and direct the flow of heated water. Boreholes at the 4100 level monitor water injection and recovery using electrical impedance tomography and seismic signal analysis.

GEOXTM: GEOXTM hopes to create the world's largest, deepest network of underground fiber-optic strain and temperature sensors and tiltmeters to measure the movement of rock systems in the underground laboratory.

Transparent Earth: The project is developing a deep seismic observatory for scientific investigations, sensor technology development and safety at the Sanford Lab.

==== Previous ====
LUX: In May 2016, the Large Underground Xenon experiment (LUX) completed its experimental run. Although it didn't detect dark matter, it was declared the most sensitive dark matter detector in the world at the time.

kISMET: The kISMET (permeability (k) and Induced Seismicity Management for Energy Technologies) drilled and cored five 50-meter deep boreholes to learn more about rock structure. The experiment was a precursor to EGS Collab.

EGS Collab: The Enhanced Geothermal Systems (EGS) Collab Project is a collaboration of eight national laboratories and six universities who are working to improve geothermal technologies. EGS conducts field experiments to better understand and model rock fracturing and other elements of geothermal energy. The experiment was a precursor to CUSSP.

DUGL: For several years, the Deep Underground Gravity Laboratory used 20 seismometers strategically placed on the surface and on several levels of Sanford Lab from the 300 to the 485 Levels. Placed in a grid, the seismometers monitored ground motion, giving researchers a 3-Dimensional seismic picture that was used to inform the design of future gravitational wave detectors. DUGL, which was decommissioned in 2017, was a Laser Interferometer Gravitational-Wave Observatory (LIGO) related project.

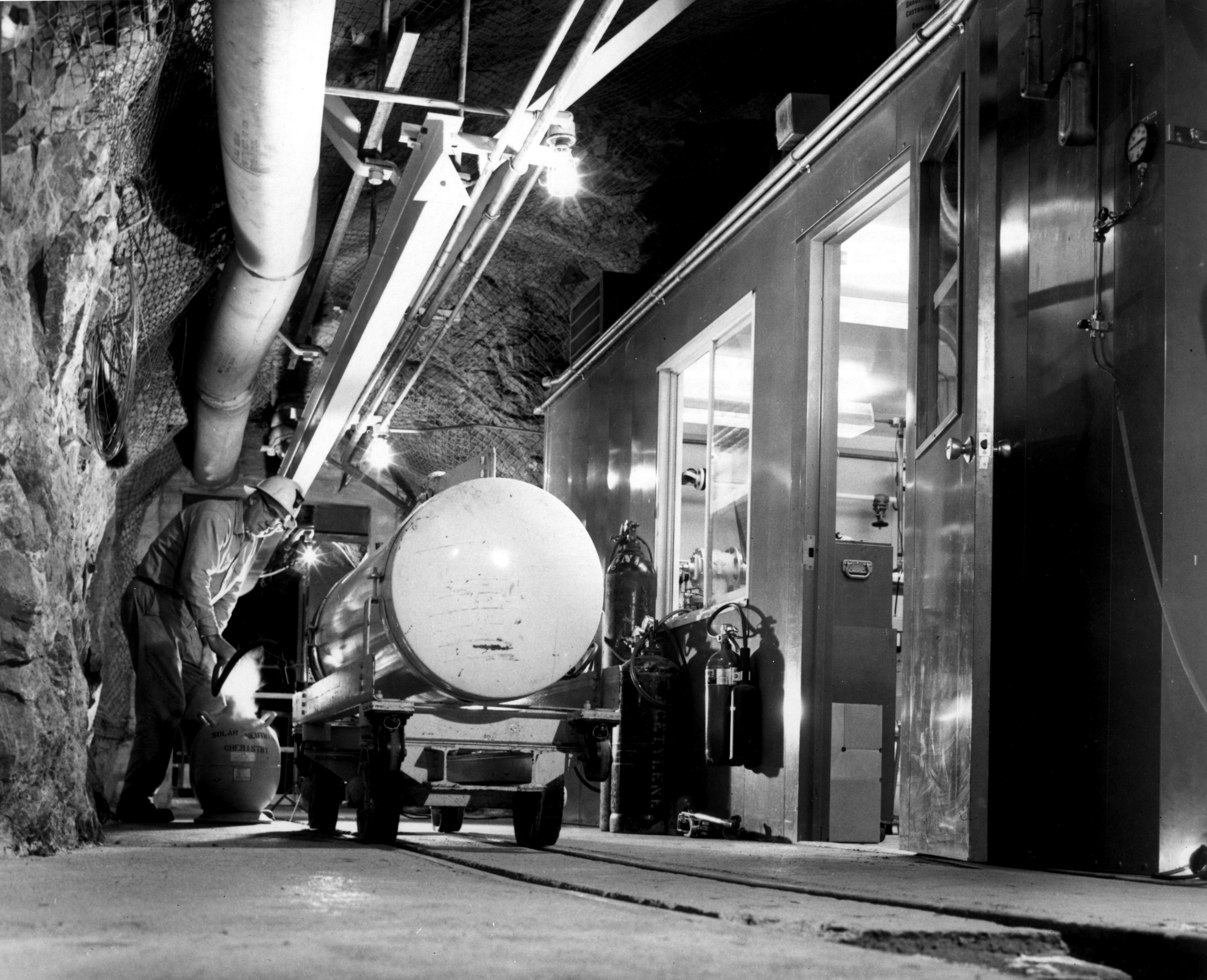
Davis's solar neutrino detector

Solar Neutrino Experiment (Davis Experiment/Homestake Experiment): Raymond Davis Jr., a pioneer in neutrino research, built a solar neutrino detector deep underground at Sanford Lab. When he discovered only a third of what had been predicted, he inadvertently created what came to be called the “solar neutrino problem.” Other experiments—Sudbury Neutrino Observatory in Canada and the Super Kamiokande in Japan—vindicated Davis's work, earning him a one-fourth share (Note: Even though there were 3 recipients of the Nobel Prize in Physics in 2002, Davis’s share was one-fourth of the prize.) of the Nobel Prize in Physics in 2002.

== Education and outreach ==
The Education and Outreach program is a collaborative venture between Sanford Lab and Black Hills State University (BHSU). The program provides resources for regional educators including 9 assembly programs, 13 curriculum modules and 12 field trips in an effort to promote STEM education.

Sanford Lab also hosts public outreach events, including Deep Talks Science for Everyone series and a city-wide science festival, Neutrino Day, which draws 1,500 attendees annually. While public tours of the facility are not available, in 2015, Sanford Lab built the Sanford Lab Homestake Visitor Center. Overlooking the ridge of the 1,000-foot-deep Open Cut, the visitor center promotes public appreciation of Lead's rich mining history and an understanding of the science advancing at Sanford Lab.

Formalized in the spring of 2014, the Sanford Science Education Center (SSEC) is a partnership between the Sanford Underground Research Facility, Black Hills State University and the Sanford Lab Homestake Visitor Center. The SSEC lends support to Sanford Lab's Education and Outreach programs, BHSU's Underground Campus and the Sanford Lab Homestake Visitor Center.

== Facility ==
SURF is located in the former Homestake Gold Mine and encompasses 223 acres (90 ha) on the surface and 7,700 acres (3,100 ha) underground. The surface property includes both the Yates Campus and the Ross Campus, named respectively for the Yates and Ross Shafts, which provide access to underground areas. The property was donated by Homestake's parent company, Barrick Gold, to the SDSTA for use as a dedicated research facility in 2006.

Homestake carved out more than 370 miles (600 km) of underground shafts, drifts and ramps, and Sanford Lab currently maintains about 12 miles (19 km) for science activities. The main level for science is the 4850 Level, which can be accessed through the Yates and Ross shafts. At 1,490 meters (4,890 ft), SURF is the deepest underground laboratory in the U.S. For experiments on the 4850 Level, the average rock overburden is approximately 4,300 meters water equivalent (m.w.e.). This depth provides significant protection from cosmic radiation from the sun for sensitive particle physics experiments.

Two main underground campuses, the Davis Campus and the Ross Campus, host experiments on the 4850 Level.

=== Davis Cavern ===
Within the Davis Campus is the Davis Cavern, which originally housed Dr. Raymond Davis Jr.'s Solar Neutrino Experiment and was redesigned and enlarged for dark matter experiments. The first, the Large Underground Xenon experiment (LUX), operated from 2013 to 2016. The Davis Cavern gave the experiment the environment it needed to become the most sensitive dark matter detector in the world, a spot it held for more than one year after it was decommissioned.

This state-of-the-art laboratory features a 72,000-gallon (272,549 liters) water tank, which serves as additional shielding from cosmic radiation; and a water-deionization system, cleanroom and control room for researchers. The researchers outfitted the Davis Cavern with a xenon purification system, servers, electronics and the experiment itself. All these are in service once again for the next-generation dark matter experiment, LUX-ZEPLIN (LZ).

=== Black Hills State University Underground Campus ===
On the 4850 Level, the Black Hills State University Underground Campus (BHUC) houses Sanford Lab's low-background counting facility—a class-1,000 cleanroom containing several ultra-sensitive low background counters (LBCs) used to assay materials for ultra-sensitive experiments—and an adjoining workspace can be used for a variety of disciplines. The facility is managed by Black Hills State University and houses five operational LBCs.

These LBCs use germanium detectors housed in lead brick containers to screen materials, identifying ionizing radiation released by a material over time as its radioactive elements decay. This counting process helps researchers decide which types of materials are best-suited for their experiments. It also provides data to researchers, allowing them to calculate how much radioactivity they can expect to see coming from their materials over the life of an experiment.

A consortium agreement between LBC owners allows the counters to be available to other universities and partners, creating opportunities for collaborative research. While the counters are dedicated to supporting high-priority experiments, the consortium allows those counters to also be used for all collaborations and academic users when there is space to spare.

=== Surface Assembly Laboratory ===
The Surface Assembly Laboratory (SAL) is a 780 square feet (72 m^{2}) laboratory with a class-1000 clean room. This laboratory provides space for researchers to clean and assemble parts of their experiments, before transporting them underground. To accommodate these processes, the SAL includes aluminum sheeting; air locks; a hoist; a 12-foot-deep (3.7 m) pit for large assembly projects; and a radon-reduction system.

=== Waste Water Treatment Plant ===
Since Sanford Lab began operating in 2008, billions of gallons of water have been treated at the Waste Water Treatment Plant (WWTP). To keep naturally-infiltrating water from accumulating underground, approximately 700 gallons of water per minute are pumped from underground to a surface reservoir where it awaits the treatment process. The water, pumped from the deepest drifts of the Sanford Lab and the tailing-laden reservoir of Grizzly Gulch, is filtered through multiple systems that clean dirt, minerals and toxins from the water, making it safe to return to natural stream systems. Once treated, the water is released into Gold Run Creek, which joins Whitewood Creek within a few hundred yards of the discharge pipe.

Sanford Lab monitors the health of these streams, counting fish and macro invertebrate populations and tests for contaminants. For this regulation, in 2019, the WWTP was recognized for the eleventh consecutive year by the South Dakota Department of Environment and Natural Resources (DENR) for their “outstanding operation of the wastewater system and environmental compliance” with DENR's Surface Water Discharge Permit Award.

== History ==
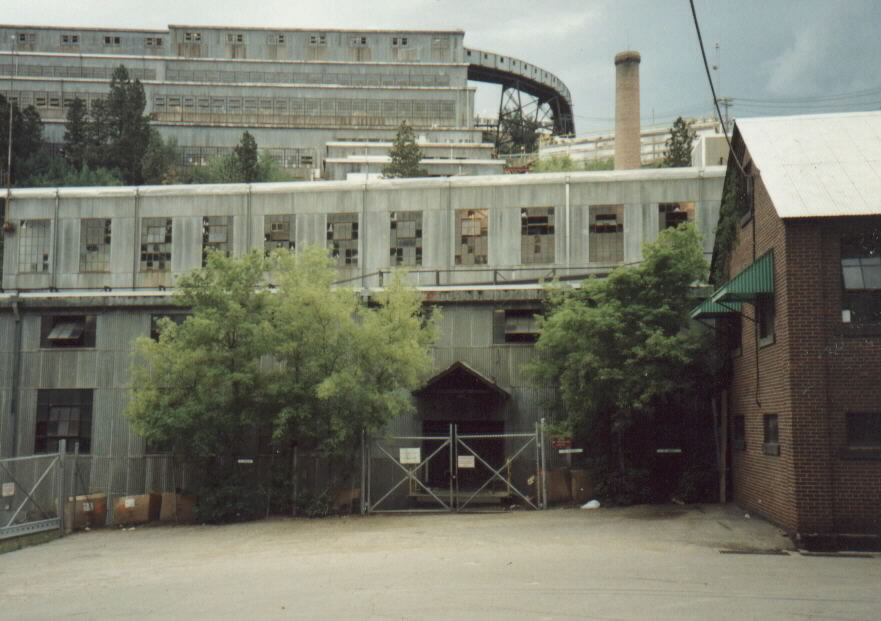
Homestake Mine buildings in 1991

The facility is housed at the previous Homestake Gold Mine, a deep underground gold mine founded during the Black Hills Gold Rush in 1876. In the late 1960s, the mine hosted the Homestake experiment. The operation, also known as the Davis experiment, allowed Raymond Davis, Jr. to measure the flux of solar neutrinos directly. The measurements' discrepancy with the flux predicted from the Sun's luminosity led to Davis's development of the solar neutrino problem. The Homestake experiment publicized the mine as a resource among scientific communities.

When the Homestake Mine closed in 2002, the National Science Foundation (NSF) had already considered the facility as a possible future site for the United States’ Deep Underground Science and Engineering Laboratory (DUSEL). In 2006, the facility's namesake T. Denny Sanford donated $70 million to the facility, Barrick Gold Corporation made a land donation and state legislation formed the South Dakota Science and Technology Authority (SDSTA), a quasi-government entity. These developments culminated with the creation of Sanford Lab in 2007.

After an extensive dewatering process, the 4850 Level of Sanford Lab was dedicated by South Dakota Governor Mike Rounds and T. Denny Sanford in 2009. The underground dedication took place in a space now designated as Governor's Corner.

In December 2010, the National Science Board decided not to fund further design of DUSEL. However, in 2011 the Department of Energy, through the Lawrence Berkeley National Laboratory, agreed to support science operations at the lab. Today, Sanford Lab operations are funded by the U.S. Department of Energy through Fermi National Accelerator Laboratory.

The first two major physics experiments located on the 4850 Level were the Large Underground Xenon (LUX) experiment and the Majorana Demonstrator experiment. LUX is housed in the same cavern that was excavated for Ray Davis's experiment in the 1960s. In October 2013, after an initial run of 80 days, LUX was determined to be the most sensitive dark matter detector in the world. The Majorana experiment is searching for a rare type of radioactive decay called neutrinoless double-beta decay. If this phenomenon were detected, it could confirm that neutrinos are their own antiparticles and provide clues as to why matter prevailed over antimatter.

In 2017, the Deep Underground Neutrino Experiment (DUNE) collaboration held a groundbreaking on the 4850 Level of Sanford Lab to mark the start of excavation for the Long-Baseline Neutrino Facility, which will host the international DUNE experiment.

== See also ==
- Kamioka Observatory
- Laboratori Nazionali del Gran Sasso
- Sudbury Neutrino Observatory
- Boulby Underground Laboratory
- Yemilab
