= Richard Gaitskell =

Physicist (born 1965)

Richard Jeremy Gaitskell (born May 2, 1965) is a physicist and professor at Brown University and a leading scientist in the search for particle dark matter. He is co-founder, a principal investigator, and co-spokesperson of the Large Underground Xenon (LUX) experiment, which announced world-leading first results on October 30, 2013. He is also a leading investigator in the new LUX-Zeplin (LZ) dark matter experiment.

== Career ==
Gaitskell was educated at Dulwich College and received his BA and MA degrees from Oxford University in 1985. He was a scholar at St John's College and is the grandson of labour party leader Hugh Gaitskell.

In 1985-1989 Gaitskell worked for the investment bank Morgan Grenfell in London, including a spell as an Assistant Director of Morgan Grenfell International.

In 1993 he received his PhD degree from Oxford University. He was awarded a Prize Fellowship at Magdalen College, Oxford, in 1993 and a Center Fellowship at Center for Particle Astrophysics, UC Berkeley in 1995. He was visiting scholar at Stanford University in 1998–2000. He has been a professor at Brown University since 2001.

Gaitskell's academic research focuses primarily on the direct detection of dark matter particles, and he has led several large-scale detection experiments. He was principal investigator on the XENON-10 experiment at the Gran Sasso National Laboratory, and a senior member of the Cryogenic Dark Matter Search from 2000 to 2005.

In 2007, Gaitskell co-founded the LUX experiment, which is currently operating 4,850 feet underground at the Sanford Underground Laboratory in Lead, South Dakota. More than 100 scientists and engineers across 18 institutions in the U.S. and Europe are involved in the LUX search for Weakly Interacting Massive Particles (WIMPs), the leading theoretical model for dark matter particles.

On October 30, 2013, LUX scientists announced the results from the detector's initial 85-day run. While LUX made no detection consistent with dark matter particles, it demonstrated an unprecedented sensitivity reaching below one zeptobarn ($10^{-45} cm^2$) WIMP-nucleon cross section for spin-independent couplings. The detector's sensitivity helps eliminate parameter space in which dark matter particles could exist. "There are basically thousands of models of particle physics lying bloodied in the gutter," Gaitskell told the audience at a Brown University colloquium following the results release. "They have been ruled out."

Gaitskell is also a leading investigator in the new LZ (LUX-ZEPLIN) dark matter experiment which will be constructed in the same underground laboratory as LUX.

== Awards and honors ==
- Hazard Professor of Physics, Brown University (2014)
- Fellow, American Physical Society (2010)
  - "For his leadership and outstanding contributions to experimental searches for particle dark matter by direct detection using a variety of cryogenic techniques; especially for his work in extending the sensitivity reach by utilizing the noble liquid xenon two phase method."
- Department of Energy Outstanding Junior Investigator (2003)
- Center Fellowship, Center for Particle Astrophysics, UC Berkeley (1995-2000)
- Lindemann Fellowship, The Lindemann Trust Committee (1995)
- Fellowship by Examination, Magdalen College, Oxford (1993-1995)
- Post Doctoral Research Fellowship, Particle Physics and Astronomy Research Council (1993-1995)
- Scholar, St John's College, Oxford University (1982-1985)

== Media Mentions and Appearances ==
Gaitskell has appeared on Richard Hammond Builds a Planet on BBC One, and on Dara O'Briain's Science Club on BBC Two. His work with the LUX experiment has been profiled in Popular Science, the Los Angeles Times and Harper's Magazine. The LUX results were covered widely in the press, including in the New York Times, Science, The Guardian and The Economist.
