= Homestake Mine (South Dakota) =

Defunct gold mine in Lead, South Dakota, USA, used for neutrino experiments

Coordinates: 44°21′22″N 103°45′53″W

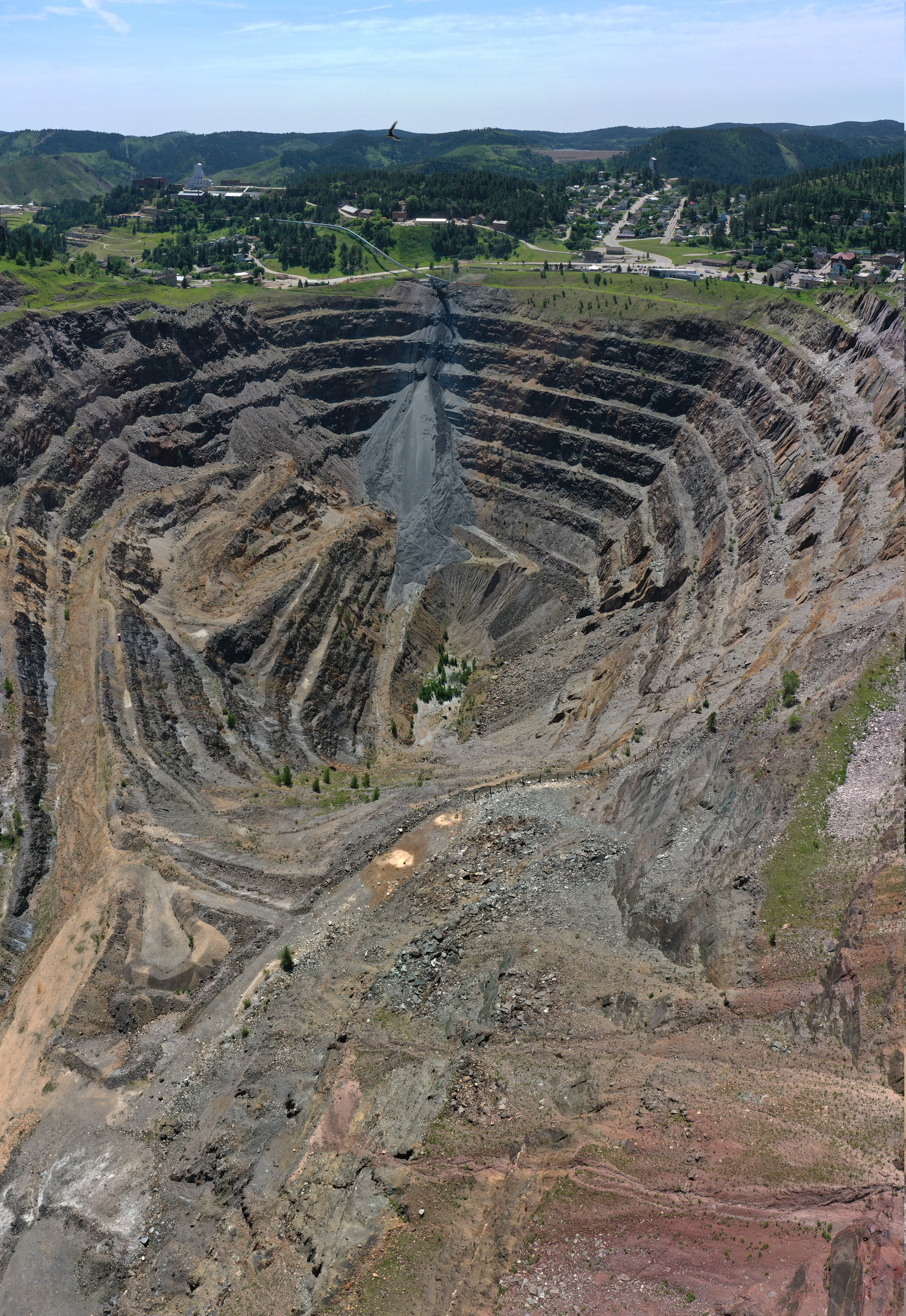
The Homestake Mine pit in Lead, South Dakota

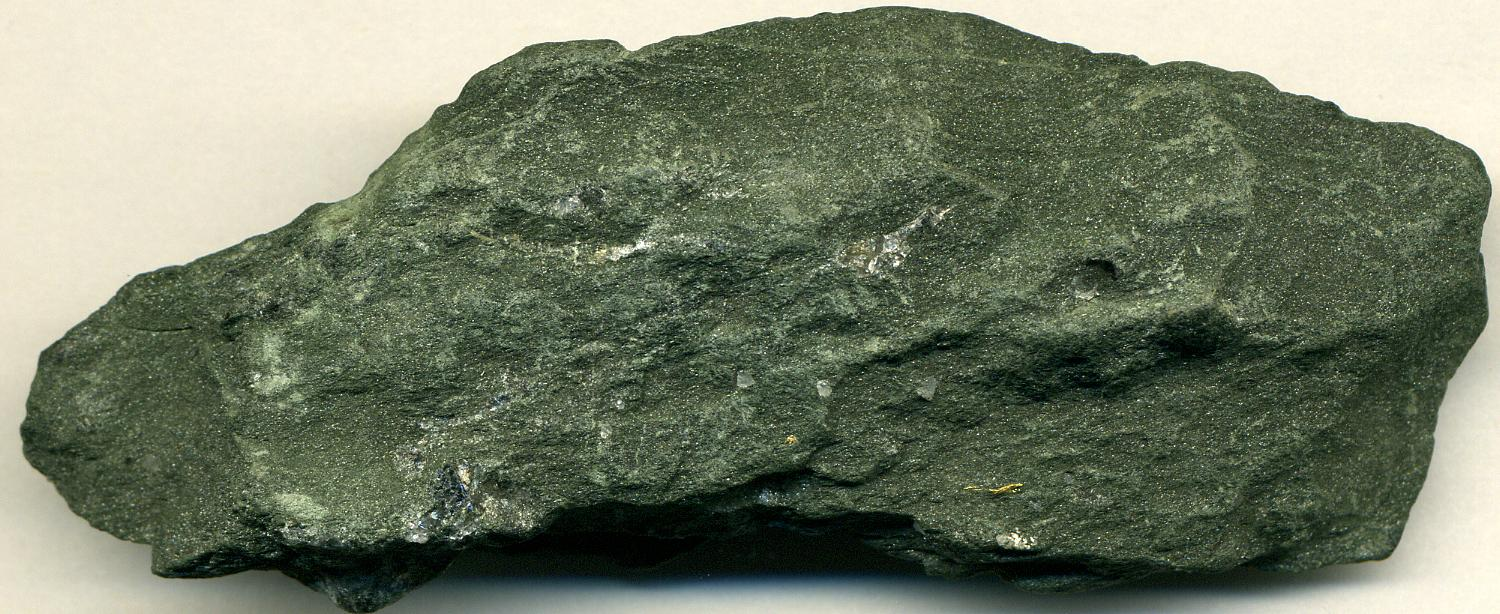
Typical auriferous (gold-bearing) greenschist gold ore from the Homestake Mine. Two small masses of native gold (Au) are visible near the bottom margin.

The Homestake Mine was a deep underground gold mine (8,000 feet or 2,438 m) located in Lead, South Dakota. Until it closed in 2002, it was the largest and deepest gold mine in the Western Hemisphere. The mine produced more than forty million troy ounces (43,900,000 oz; 1,240,000 kg) of gold during its lifetime. This is about 2,500 cubic feet (71 m^{3}) or a volume of gold roughly equal to 18,677 US gallons.

The Homestake Mine is famous in scientific circles because of the work of a deep underground laboratory that was established there in the mid-1960s. This was the site where the solar neutrino problem was first discovered, in what is known as the Homestake Experiment. Raymond Davis Jr. conducted this experiment in the mid-1960s, which was the first to observe solar neutrinos.

On July 10, 2007, the mine was selected by the National Science Foundation as the location for the Deep Underground Science and Engineering Laboratory (DUSEL). It won over several candidates, including the Henderson Mine near Empire, Colorado.

== History ==
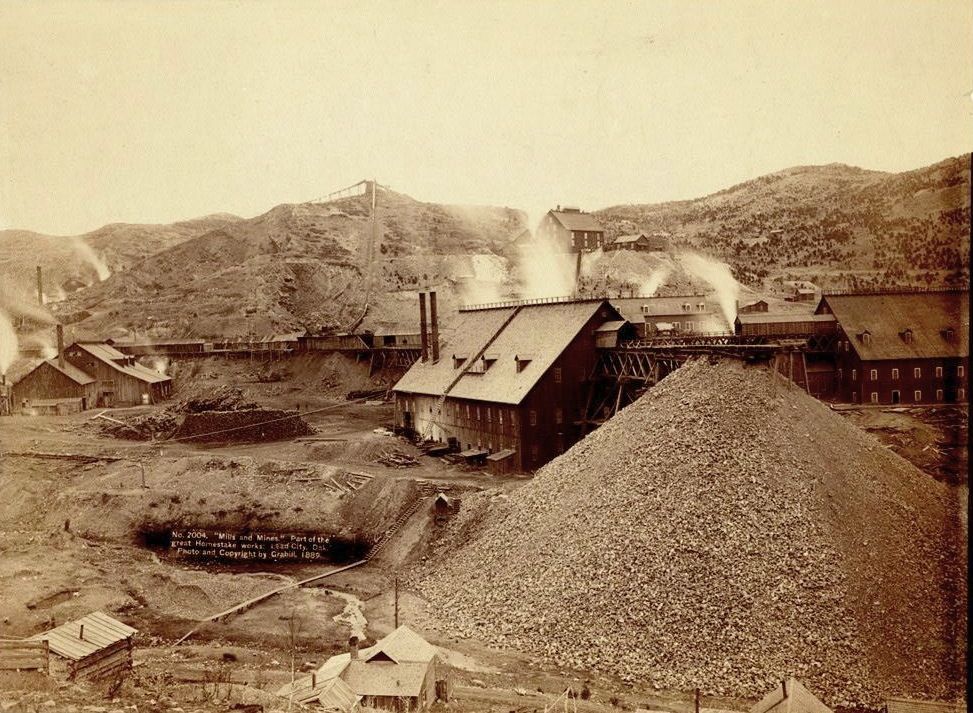
The Homestake Mine in 1889

Sioux people living near the Homestake deposit knew about gold in the area but did not find it useful. Missionary Pierre-Jean De Smet warned Native people not to tell settlers about the gold, because, "white men would kill every Indian on the plains if they found out about the gold."

In 1876, settlers Fred and Moses Manuel, Alex Engh, and Hank Harney discovered the Homestake deposit during the Black Hills Gold Rush. The Black Hills had been guaranteed to the Lakota Nation by the Fort Laramie Treaty, but the land was stolen for its gold.

A trio of mining entrepreneurs, George Hearst, Lloyd Tevis, and James Ben Ali Haggin, bought the claim from Manuel, Manuel, Engh, and Harney for $70,000 in 1877 (~$1.9 million in 2024). George Hearst reached Deadwood in October 1877 and took control of the mine property. Hearst arranged to haul the mining equipment by wagon from the nearest railhead in Sidney, Nebraska. Arthur De Wint Foote worked as an engineer. Despite the remote location, deep mines were dug and ore began to be produced. An 80-stamp mill was built, and began crushing Homestake ore by July 1878.

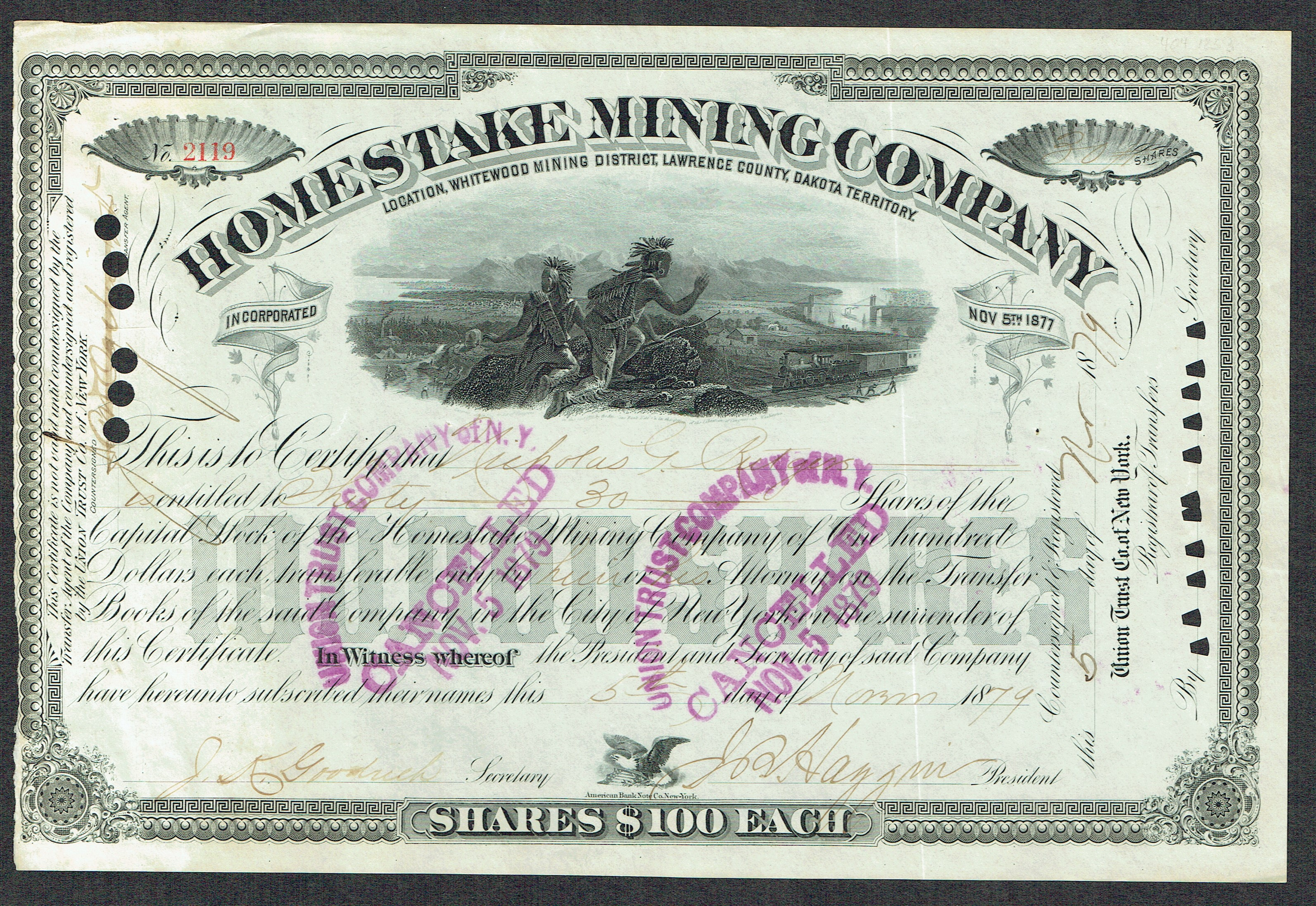
Share of the Homestake Mining Company, issued 5. November 1879

In 1879 the partners sold shares in the Homestake Mining Company, and listed it on the New York Stock Exchange. The Homestake would become one of the longest-listed stocks in the history of the NYSE, as Homestake operated the mine until 2001.

Hearst consolidated and enlarged the Homestake property by fair and foul means. He bought out some adjacent claims, and secured others in the courts. A Hearst employee killed a man who refused to sell his claim, but was acquitted in court after all the witnesses disappeared. Hearst purchased newspapers in Deadwood to influence public opinion. An opposing newspaper editor was physically attacked on a Deadwood street. Hearst realized that he might be on the receiving end of violence, and wrote a letter to his partners asking them to provide for his family should he be murdered. Within three years, Hearst had established the mine and acquired significant claims. He walked out alive, and very rich.

By the time Hearst left the Black Hills in March 1879, he had added the claims of Giant, Golden Star, Netty, May Booth, Golden Star No. 2, Crown Point, Sunrise, and General Ellison to the original two claims of the Manuel Brothers, Golden Terra and Old Abe, totaling 30 acres (12 ha). The ten-stamp mill had become 200, and 500 employees worked in the mine, mills, offices and shops. Hearst owned the Boulder Ditch and water rights to Whitewood Creek, monopolizing the region. His railroad, Black Hills & Fort Pierre Railroad, gave him access to eastern Dakota Territory.

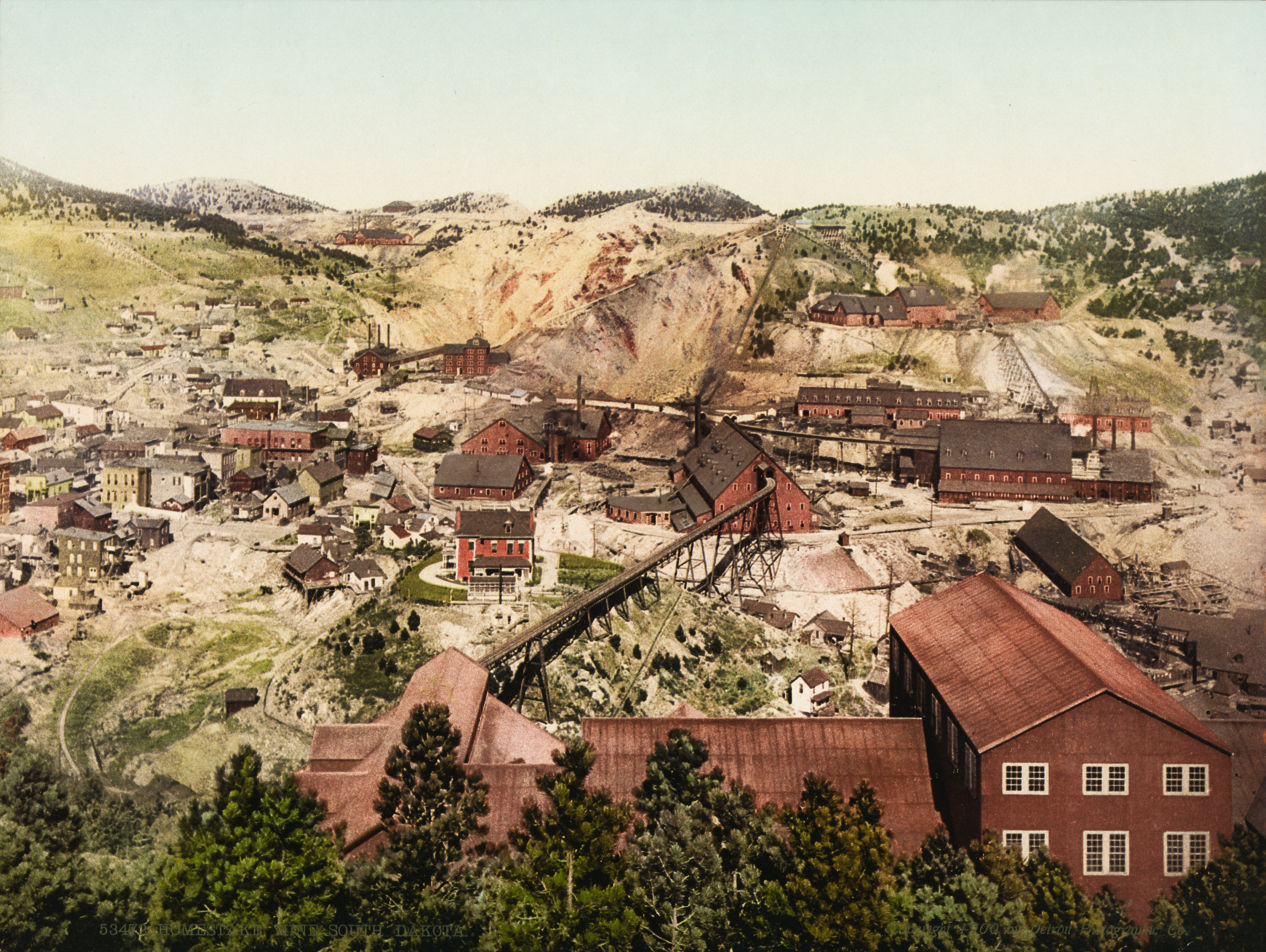
Homestake Mine in 1900

By 1900, Homestake owned 300 claims, on 2,000 acres (810 ha), and was worked by more than 2000 employees. In 1901, the mine started using compressed air locomotives, fully replacing mules and horses by the 1920s. Charles Washington Merrill introduced cyanidization to augment mercury-amalgamation for gold recovery. "Cyanide Charlie" achieved 94 per cent recovery. The gold was shipped to the Denver Mint.

By 1906, the Ellison Shaft reached 1,550 feet (472 m), the B&M 1,250 feet (381 m), the Golden Star 1,100 feet (335 m), and the Golden Prospect 900 feet (274 m), producing 1,500,000 short tons (1,300,000 long tons; 1,400,000 metric tons) of ore. A disastrous fire struck on 25 March 1907, which took forty days to extinguish after the mine was flooded. Another disastrous fire struck in 1919.

In 1927, company geologist Donald H. McLaughlin used a winze from the 2,000 level to demonstrate that ore reached the 3,500 foot level. The Ross shaft was started in 1934, a second winze from the 3,500-foot (1,100 m) level reached 4,100 feet (1,250 m), and a third winze from 4,100 feet (1,250 m) was started in 1937. The Yates shaft was started in 1938. Production ceased during WWII from 1943 until 1945, due to Limitation Order L-208 from the War Production Board. By 1975, mining operations had reached the 6,800-foot (2,073 m) level, and two winzes were planned to 8,000 feet (2,438 m).

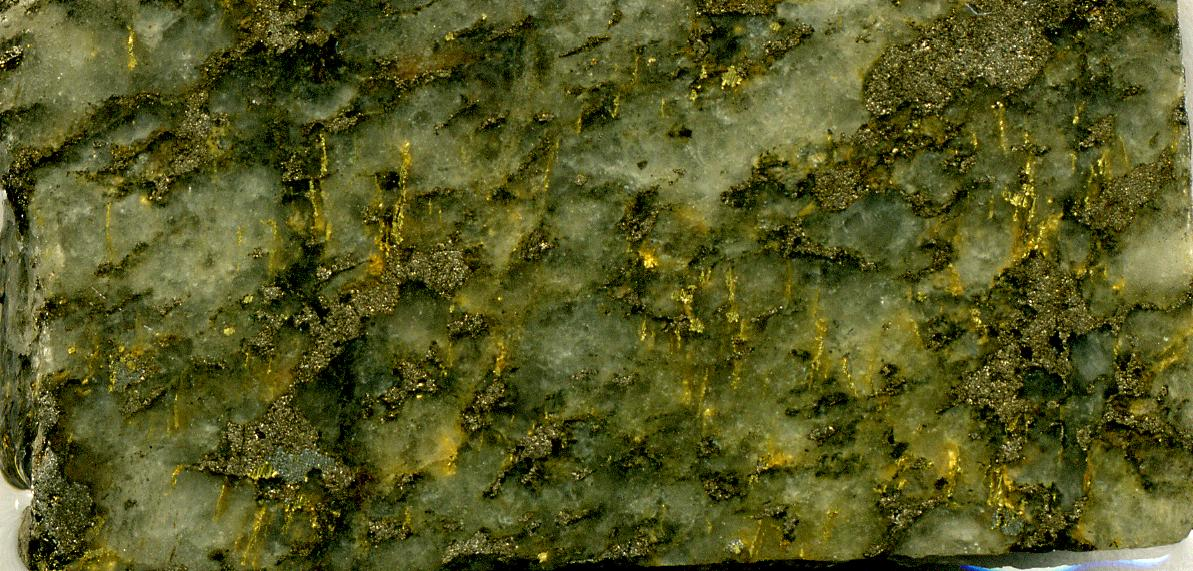
Homestake high-grade gold ore; view is about 1.2 cm (1/2 in) wide

The gold ore mined at Homestake was considered low grade (less than one ounce per ton), but the body of ore was large. Through 2001, the mine produced 39,800,000 troy ounces (43,700,000 oz; 1,240,000 kg) of gold and 9,000,000 troy ounces (9,870,000 oz; 280,000 kg) of silver. In terms of total production, the Lead Mining District, of which the Homestake mine is the only producer, was the second-largest gold producer in the United States, after the Carlin district in Nevada. Homestake was the longest continually operating mine in United States history.

The Homestake mine ceased production at the end of 2001. Reasons included low gold prices, poor ore quality, and high costs.

The Homestake mine released arsenic into the Cheyenne River for decades. Although the area was designated a Superfund site, water was still contaminated in 2017.

== Conversion to use for scientific research ==
The Barrick Gold corporation (which had merged with the Homestake Mining Company in mid-2001) agreed in early 2002 to keep dewatering the mine while owners were negotiating with the National Science Foundation over the mine as a potential site for a new deep underground laboratory (DUSEL). But progress was slow and maintaining the pumps and ventilation was costing $250,000 per month. The owners switched the equipment off on June 10, 2003 and closed the mine completely.

The Homestake Mine was selected in 2007 by NSF for DUSEL, and in June 2009 researchers at University of California Berkeley announced that Homestake would be reopened for scientific research on neutrinos and dark matter particles. In 2010 NSF decided to end DUSEL funding, and the site was transferred to the DOE in 2011 as the Sanford Underground Research Facility (SURF), hosting the Large Underground Xenon experiment (LUX), the Majorana Demonstrator, and the Deep Underground Neutrino Experiment (DUNE).

The mine is the site for research into enhanced geothermal systems (EGS) with deep access to dense and stable rock. Pressurized water injected inside boreholes fractures the rock, enhancing its permeability to improve thermal energy extraction. The Department of Energy (DOE) began funding basic science with Kismet in 2014, followed by EGS Collab in 2016 and by the Center for Understanding Subsurface Signals and Permeability (CUSSP) in 2023.

== Geology ==
The gold at Homestake is almost exclusively confined to the Homestake Formation, an Early Proterozoic layer with iron carbonate and iron silicate. The original 20–30 m thick Homestake Formation, has been deformed and metamorphosed, resulting in upper greenschist facies of siderite-phyllite, and lower amphibolite facies of grunerite schists.

The iron may have been deposited by volcanic exhalation, perhaps in the presence of microorganisms as a banded iron formation. Gold ore mineralization is most intense in the Main Ledge, at the surface, and the 9 Ledge, at the 3200 level (feet below the Incline Shaft, at 1594 m above sea level).

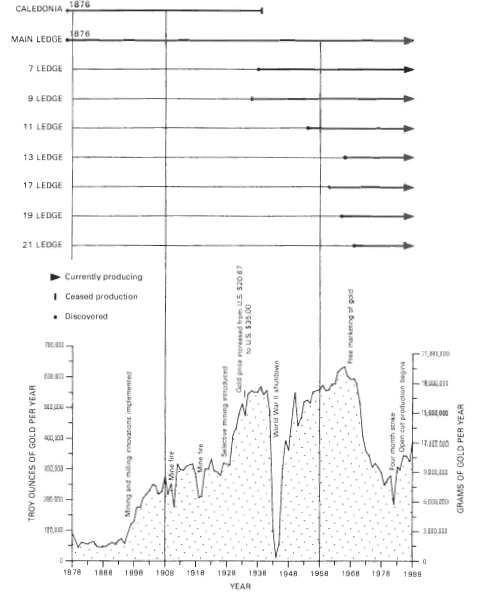
Gold production and ore ledge discovery

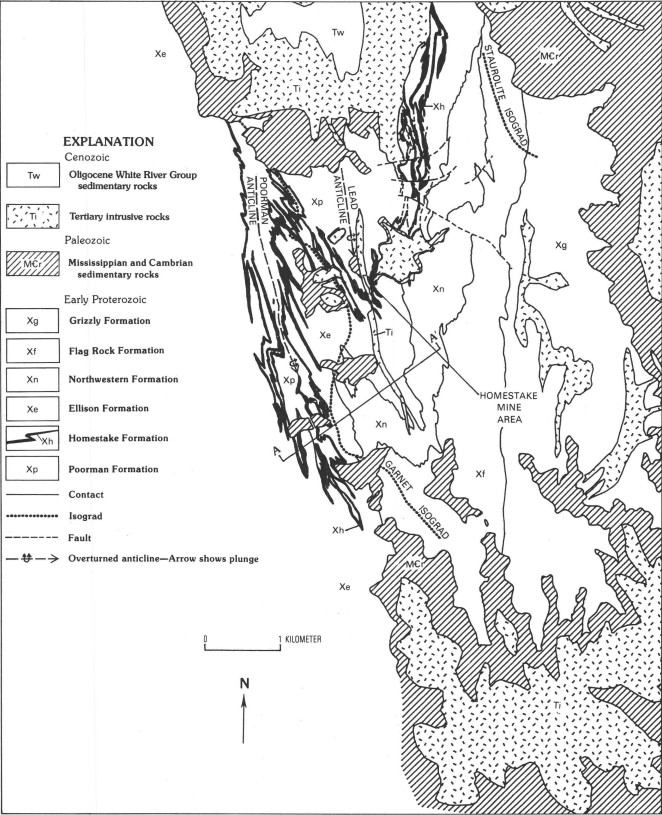
Geologic map of the Black Hills

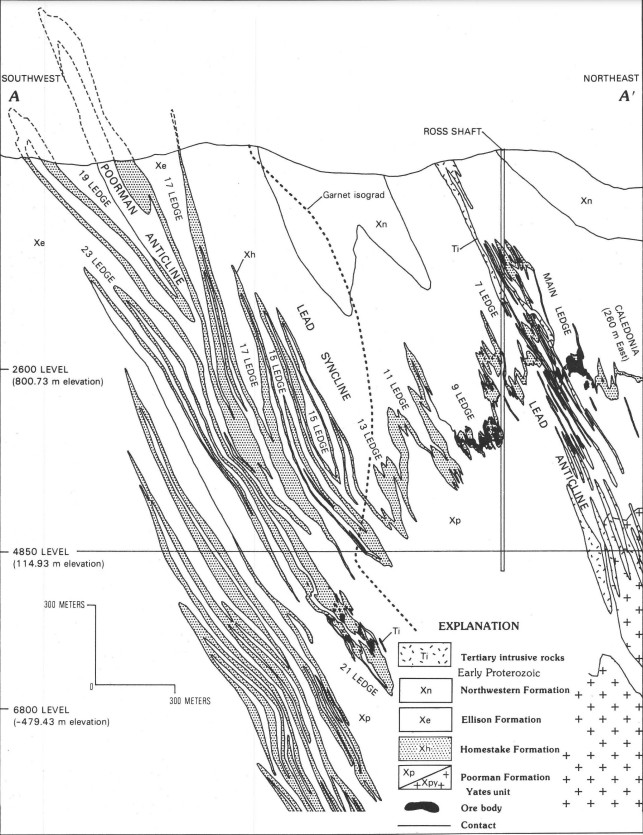
Geologic cross section. The Homestake Formation has been deformed into synclines, odd numbers, and anticlines, even numbers. Ore mineralization occurred mainly in the synclines, called Ledges.

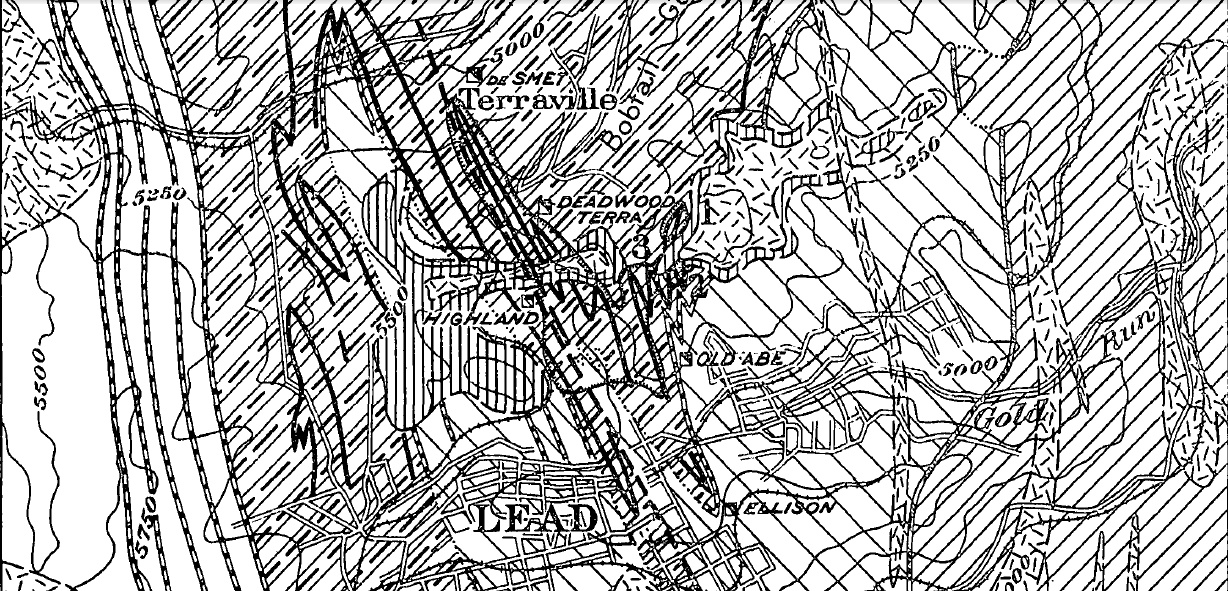
Lead Geologic Map. Note the locations of the Ellison, Old Abe, Highland, Deadwood Terra, and DeSmet shafts, south to north. The Caledonia Cut is labelled with a "1".

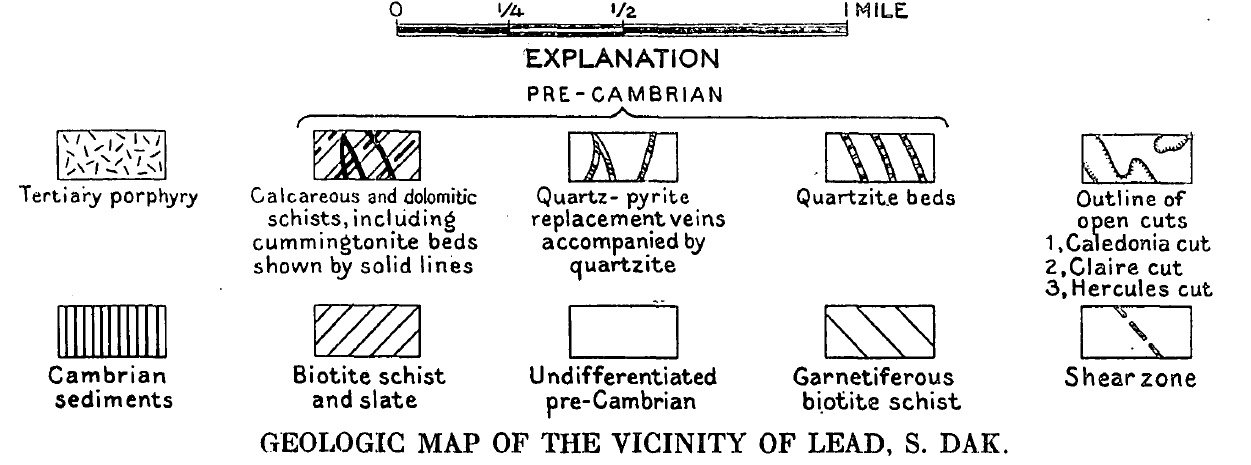
Lead Geologic Map Legend

== See also ==
- Colorado Mineral Belt, regarding the Henderson Mine
- Volcanogenic massive sulfide ore deposit (VMS), the base-metal rich equivalent to Homestake
