= Time projection chamber =

Type of particle detector

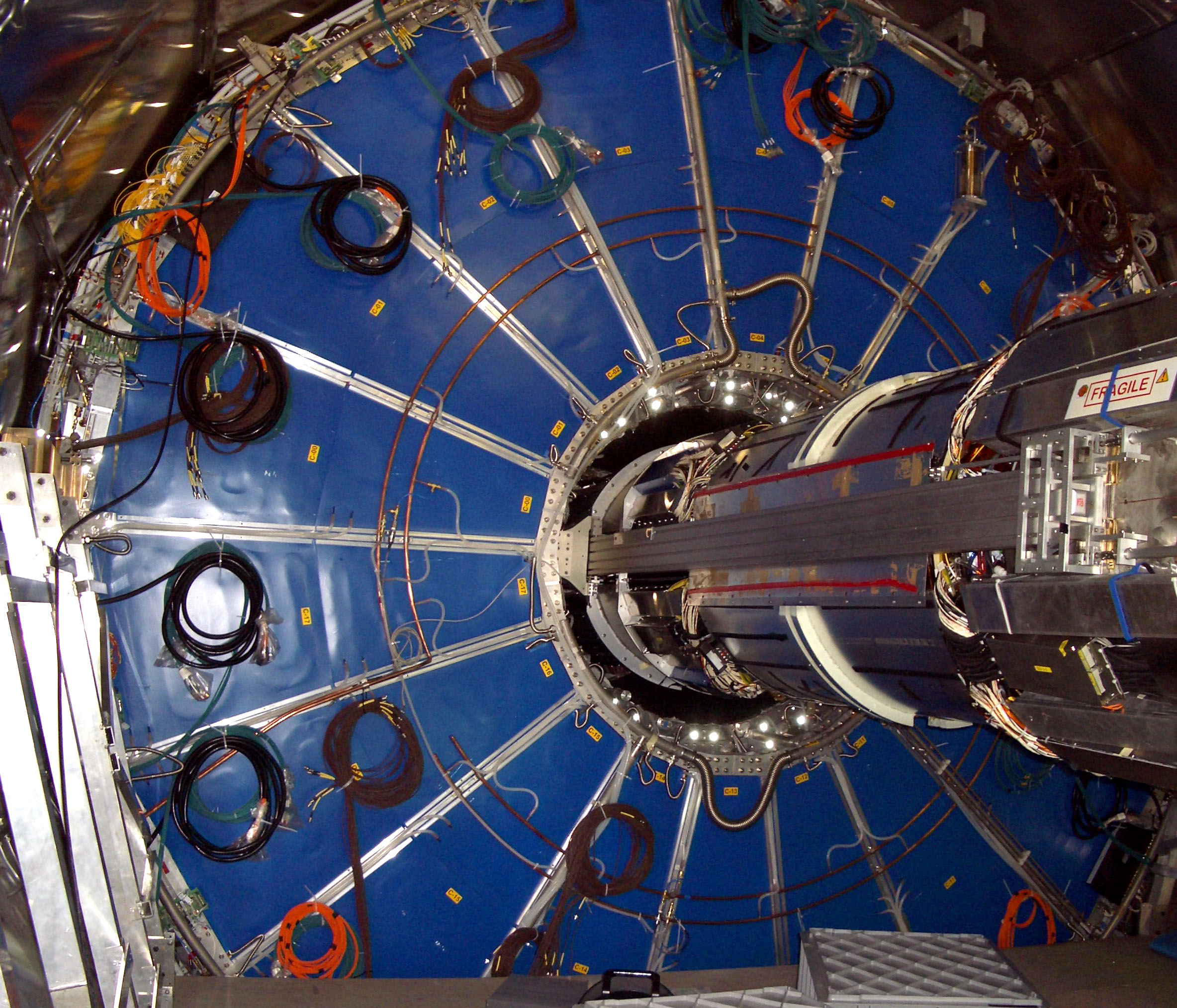
The TPC of the ALICE experiment at CERN

In physics, a time projection chamber (TPC) is a type of particle detector that uses a combination of electric fields and magnetic fields together with a sensitive volume of gas or liquid to perform a three-dimensional reconstruction of a particle trajectory or interaction.

== The original design ==
The original TPC was proposed in 1974 by David R. Nygren, an American physicist, and developed at Lawrence Berkeley Laboratory in the late 1970s. Its first major application was in the PEP-4 detector, which studied 29 GeV electron–positron collisions at the PEP storage ring at SLAC.

A time projection chamber consists of a gas-filled detection volume in an electric field with a position-sensitive electron collection system. The original design (and the one most commonly used) is a cylindrical chamber with multi-wire proportional chambers (MWPC) as endplates. Along its length, the chamber is divided into halves by means of a central high-voltage electrode disc, which establishes an electric field between the center and the end plates. Furthermore, a magnetic field is often applied along the length of the cylinder, parallel to the electric field, in order to minimize the diffusion of the electrons coming from the ionization of the gas. On passing through the detector gas, a particle will produce primary ionization along its track. The z coordinate (along the cylinder axis) is determined by measuring the drift time from the ionization event to the MWPC at the end. This is done using the usual technique of a drift chamber. The MWPC at the end is arranged with the anode wires in the azimuthal direction, θ, which provides information on the radial coordinate, r. To obtain the azimuthal direction, each cathode plane is divided into strips along the radial direction.

In recent years other means of position-sensitive electron amplification and detection have become more widely used, especially in conjunction with the increased application of time projection chambers in nuclear physics. These usually combine a segmented anode plate with either just a Frisch grid or an active electron-multiplication element like a gas electron multiplier. These newer TPCs also depart from the traditional geometry of a cylinder with an axial field in favour of a flat geometry or a cylinder with a radial field.

Earlier researchers in particle physics also usually made use of a more simplified box-shaped geometry arranged directly above or below the beam line, such as in the CERN NA49 and NA35 experiments.

== The Liquid Argon Time Projection Chamber (LArTPC) ==
In 1974, William J. Willis and Veljko Radeka demonstrated that total absorption calorimetry was possible in liquid argon detectors without the amplification that normally occurs in a gaseous ionization detector. This critical technology enabled the possibility of a time projection chamber based on Nygren's original design, but using liquid argon as the sensitive medium instead of gas.

In 1976, Herbert H. Chen, with collaborators at University of California, Irvine and the California Institute of Technology, proposed one of the earliest uses of liquid argon in a time projection chamber (LArTPC). Chen's initial goals with such a detector were to study neutrino-electron scattering, but the goals evolved to measure solar or cosmic neutrinos or proton decay.

In 1977, Carlo Rubbia independently, and nearly simultaneously, proposed to construct an LArTPC at CERN for rare event particle physics experiments.

=== Detector design and properties ===
Liquid argon is advantageous as a sensitive medium for several reasons. The fact that argon is a noble element and therefore has a vanishing electronegativity means that electrons produced by ionizing radiation will not be absorbed as they drift toward the detector readout. Argon also scintillates when an energetic charged particle passes by, releasing a number of scintillation photons that is proportional to the energy deposited in the argon by the passing particle. Liquid argon is also relatively inexpensive, making large-scale projects economically feasible. However, one of the primary motivations for using liquid argon as a sensitive medium is its density. Liquid argon is around one thousand times denser than the gas used in Nygren's TPC design, which increases the likelihood of a particle interacting in a detector by a factor of around one thousand. This feature is particularly useful in neutrino physics, where neutrino–nucleon interaction cross sections are small.

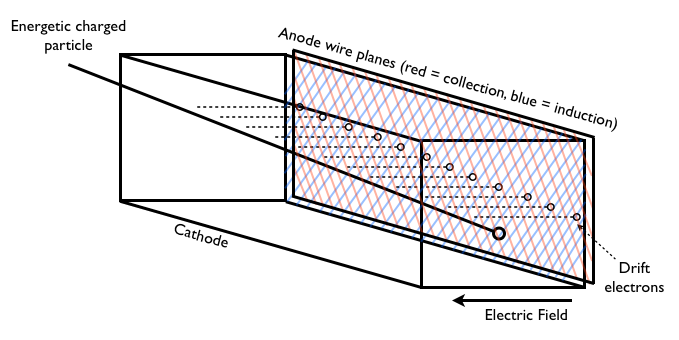
A diagram of LArTPC design and basic operating principles

The body of a typical LArTPC is formed of three parts. On one side of the detector is a high-voltage cathode plane, used to establish a drift electric field across the TPC. Although the exact electric potential at which this is set is dependent on the detector geometry, this high-voltage cathode typically produces a drift field of 500 V/cm across the detector.

On the side opposite of the cathode plane is a set of anode wire planes set at potentials much higher (less negative) than that of the cathode. Each plane is separated from its neighbors by a small gap, usually on the order of 1 cm. A plane consists of many parallel conducting wires spaced by a few millimeters, and the angle at which the wires are oriented relative to the vertical varies from plane to plane. Together, these planes read out signals from the drift electrons. For a detector with N anode wire planes, the inner N − 1 planes are called induction planes. These are set at lower (more negative) potentials than the outer plane, allowing drift electrons to pass through them, inducing signals that are used for event reconstruction. The outer plane is called the collection plane because the drift electrons are collected on these wires, producing additional signals. Having multiple planes with different wire orientations permits two-dimensional event reconstruction, while the third dimension is found from electron drift times.

The third part is a field cage between the cathode and anode. This field cage maintains a uniform electric field between the cathode and the anode, so that drift electron trajectories deviate as little as possible from the shortest path between the point of ionization and the anode plane. This is intended to prevent distortion of particle trajectory during event reconstruction.

A light-collection system often accompanies the basic LArTPC as a means of extracting more information from an event by scintillation light. It can also play an important role in triggering, because it collects scintillation light only nanoseconds after the particle passes through the detector. This is comparatively (on the order of 1000 times) shorter than the time taken by the freed electrons to drift to the wire planes, so it is often sufficient to demarcate the collection time of scintillation photons as a trigger time (t_{0}) for an event. With this trigger time, one can then find electron drift times, which enables three-dimensional reconstruction of an event. While such systems are not the only means by which a LArTPC can identify a trigger time, they are necessary for studying phenomena like supernovae and proton decay, where the particles undergoing decay or interaction are not produced in a human-made accelerator and the timing of a beam of particles is therefore not known. Photomultiplier tubes, light guides, and silicon photomultipliers are examples of instruments used to collect this light. These are typically positioned just outside the drift volume.

=== Signal readout ===
In a typical LArTPC, each wire in each anode plane is part of an RC circuit, with the wire itself located between the resistor and capacitor. The other end of the resistor is wired to a bias voltage, and the other end of the capacitor is wired to the front-end electronics. The front-end electronics amplify and digitize the current in the circuit. This amplified and digitized current as a function of time is the "signal" that is passed to the event reconstruction.

For a given anode plane wire, the signal produced will have a specific form that depends on whether the wire is located in an induction plane or in a collection plane. As a drift electron moves toward a wire in an induction plane, it induces a current in the wire, producing a "bump" in output current. As the electron moves away from a wire, it induces a current in the opposite direction, producing an output "bump" of the opposite sign as the first. The result is a bipolar signal. In contrast, signals for a collection plane wire are unipolar, since electrons do not pass by the wire but are instead "collected" by it. For both of these geometries, a larger signal amplitude implies that more drift electrons either passed by the wire (for induction planes) or were collected by it (for the collection plane).

The signal readout of all of the wires in a given anode plane can be organized into a 2D picture of a particle interaction. Such a picture is a projection of the 3D particle interaction onto a 2D plane whose normal vector is parallel to the wires in the specified anode plane. The 2D projections corresponding to each of the anode planes are combined to fully reconstruct the 3D interaction.

== Dual-phase TPC ==
The technique itself was first developed for radiation detection using argon in the early 1970s. The ZEPLIN programme pioneered the use of two-phase technology for WIMP searches. The XENON and LUX series of detectors represent the state-of the art implementation of this instrument in physics.

== Dark Matter Time Projection Chamber ==
The Dark Matter Time Projection Chamber is an experiment for direct detection of weakly interacting massive particles (WIMPs), one of the most favored candidates for dark matter. The experiment uses a low-pressure time projection chamber in order to extract the original direction of potential dark matter events. The collaboration includes physicists from the Massachusetts Institute of Technology (MIT), Boston University (BU), Brandeis University, and Royal Holloway University of London. Several prototype detectors have been built and tested in laboratories at MIT and BU. The collaboration took its first data in an underground laboratory at the Waste Isolation Pilot Plant (WIPP) site near Carlsbad, New Mexico in Fall, 2010.

Dark Matter Time Projection Chamber published first results from a surface run in 2010, setting a spin-dependent cross section limit.
