= LZ experiment =

Particle physics experiment in South Dakota, United States

LUX–Zeplin (LZ) experiment
- experiment
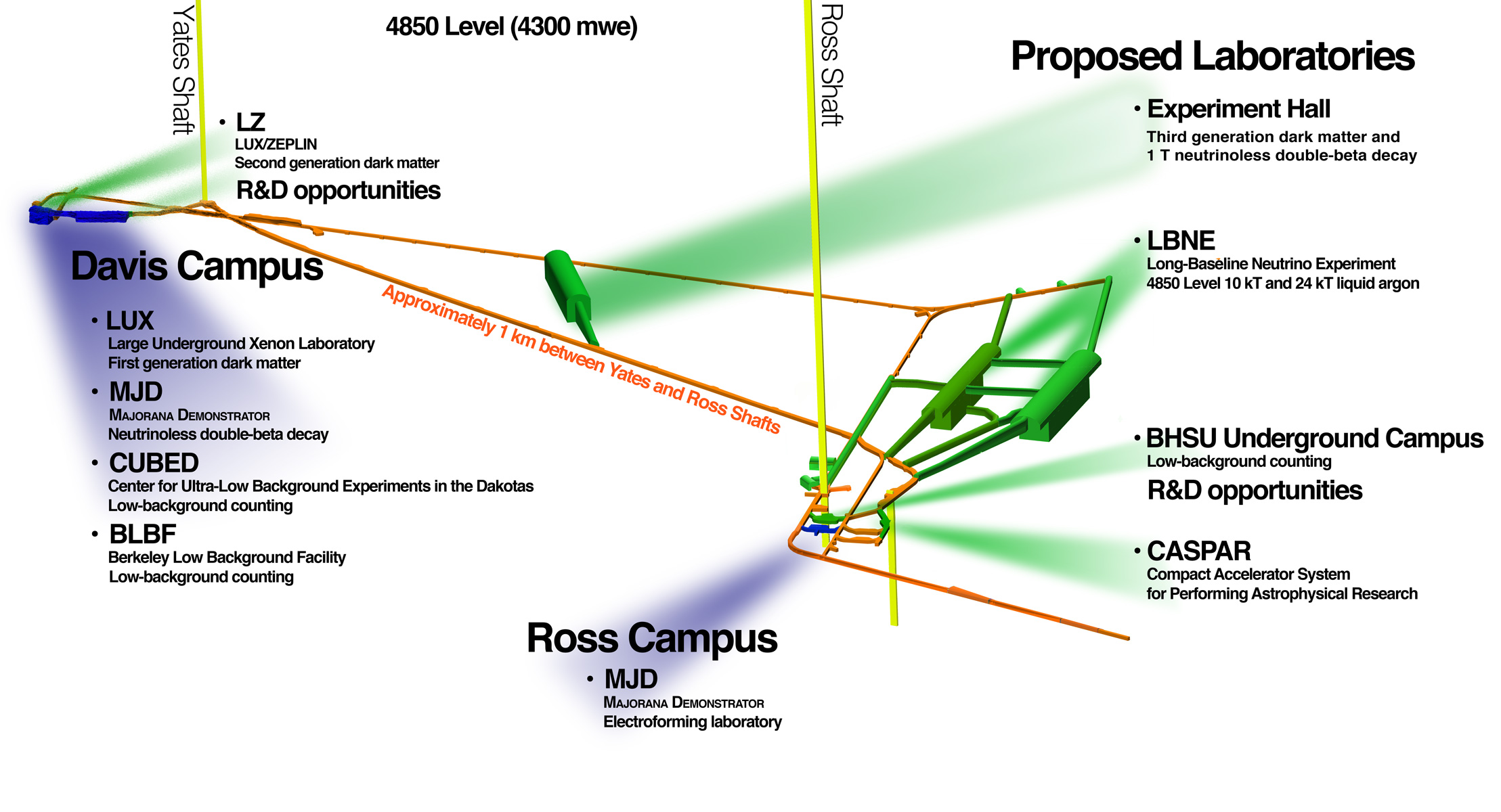
- Country: United States
- State: South Dakota
- Website: The LZ Dark Matter Experiment

The LUX–ZEPLIN (LZ) Experiment is a second-generation dark matter direct detection experiment hoping to observe weakly interacting massive particles (WIMP) scattering on nuclei. It was formed in 2012 by combining the LUX and ZEPLIN groups. It is currently a collaboration of 30 institutes in the US, UK, Portugal and South Korea. The experiment is located at about 1,500 metres under the Sanford Underground Research Facility (SURF) in South Dakota, and is managed by the United States Department of Energy's (DOE) Lawrence Berkeley National Lab (Berkeley Lab).

The experiment uses an ultra-sensitive detector made of 7 tonnes of liquid xenon to hunt for signals of WIMP-nucleus interactions. It is one of three such experiments which lead the search for direct detection of WIMPs above 10 GeV/c^{2}, the other two being the XENON experiment and the PANDAX-4T experiment.

In the spring of 2015, LZ passed the "Critical Decision Step 1" or CD-1 review, and became an official DOE project. U.S. Department of Energy officials on Sept. 21, 2020 formally signed off on project completion for LZ; DOE's project completion milestone is called Critical Decision 4, or CD-4.

As of December 2025, results from LZ have found no evidence of WIMPs above a mass of 9 GeV/c^{2}. In September 2026, the collaboration announced the observation of a single high-energy event from 2023 with 2-3σ significance relative to the expected backgrounds. Further analyses, including with observations made since 2023, are necessary to ascertain the validity of this event as a possible WIMP detection.

== Low-background detector ==
To conclusively identify WIMP-nucleus scatters, LZ must be able to observe very small energy depositions in its active volume. However, it must also be able to differentiate true WIMP scatters from other interactions caused by bias. Examples of these known "backgrounds" are interactions from gamma rays produced by trace radioactivity in the environment, interactions from neutrons produced in the environment, and interactions from cosmic ray muons produced in the upper atmosphere. The two goals of a dark matter search are to minimize the number of these background interactions, and for those that do occur, to be able to identify that they are from background (as opposed to WIMPs).

First, the innermost detector is composed of a dual-phase xenon time projection chamber (TPC). This detector is the target for WIMP-nucleus scatters. As discussed in the next section, this detector can perform a 3-D reconstruction of the position of an interaction in the xenon. This enables an identification and rejection of background interactions that happen near the periphery (sides, top, and bottom) of the detector. These peripheral interactions are overwhelmingly likely to be from external gamma rays or neutrons and radioactive decays of trace radionuclides in the detector components composing the TPC and cryostats. Moreover, the relatively large density of liquid xenon allows the TPC to "self-shield" to a degree: gamma rays (neutrons) entering the TPC can travel only approximately a few centimetres (10 centimetres) before scattering and being stopped. As a result, the innermost volume of the detector is largely free of many of these backgrounds. Because it is so quiet, this innermost, or "fiducial" volume is very sensitive to observing WIMP scatters above other backgrounds, and is the space in which LZ's WIMP searches are conducted.

Next, the TPC is located inside several layers of active and passive shielding to reduce rates of external gamma rays and neutrons. The TPC is housed in an inner cryostat, which maintains the temperatures needed to keep the xenon in the liquid phase (approximately 178K). This inner cryostat is nested in a larger, outer cryostat, which helps limit heat transfer into the xenon. External to the outer cryostat is a set of acrylic tanks holding liquid scintillator. This scintillator is liquid-alkyl-benzene (LAB) loaded with gadolinium for more efficient neutron capture.

If a gamma ray or neutron scatters once inside the TPC but then exits, it will likely also deposit energy in the scintillator. These energy deposits are accompanied by emission of optical photons, which can be detected by an array of photomultiplier tubes (PMTs) located outside of the acrylic tanks. By observing such a signal in coincidence with a scatter in the TPC, it becomes possible to reject backgrounds in the TPC that might otherwise look like WIMP scatters. This is particularly important for neutrons, which can penetrate farther than gamma rays and which scatter on the xenon nucleus in the same way that WIMPs are expected to (instead of on xenon's atomic electrons).

The outer-detector PMT array is located in a larger water tank. Together, the water tank and liquid scintillator also provide significant passive shielding against external gamma rays and neutrons, stopping a vast majority of them before they have the chance to enter the TPC. The whole assembly is located approximately one mile underground, in the Davis Cavern at SURF. This underground location creates a rock overburden that significantly reduces the rate of cosmic ray muons entering the TPC relative to the rate at Earth's surface. All together these different strategies ensure that LZ is a detector capable of performing a very sensitive search for dark matter scatters on xenon nuclei.

== Inner detector: dual phase TPC ==
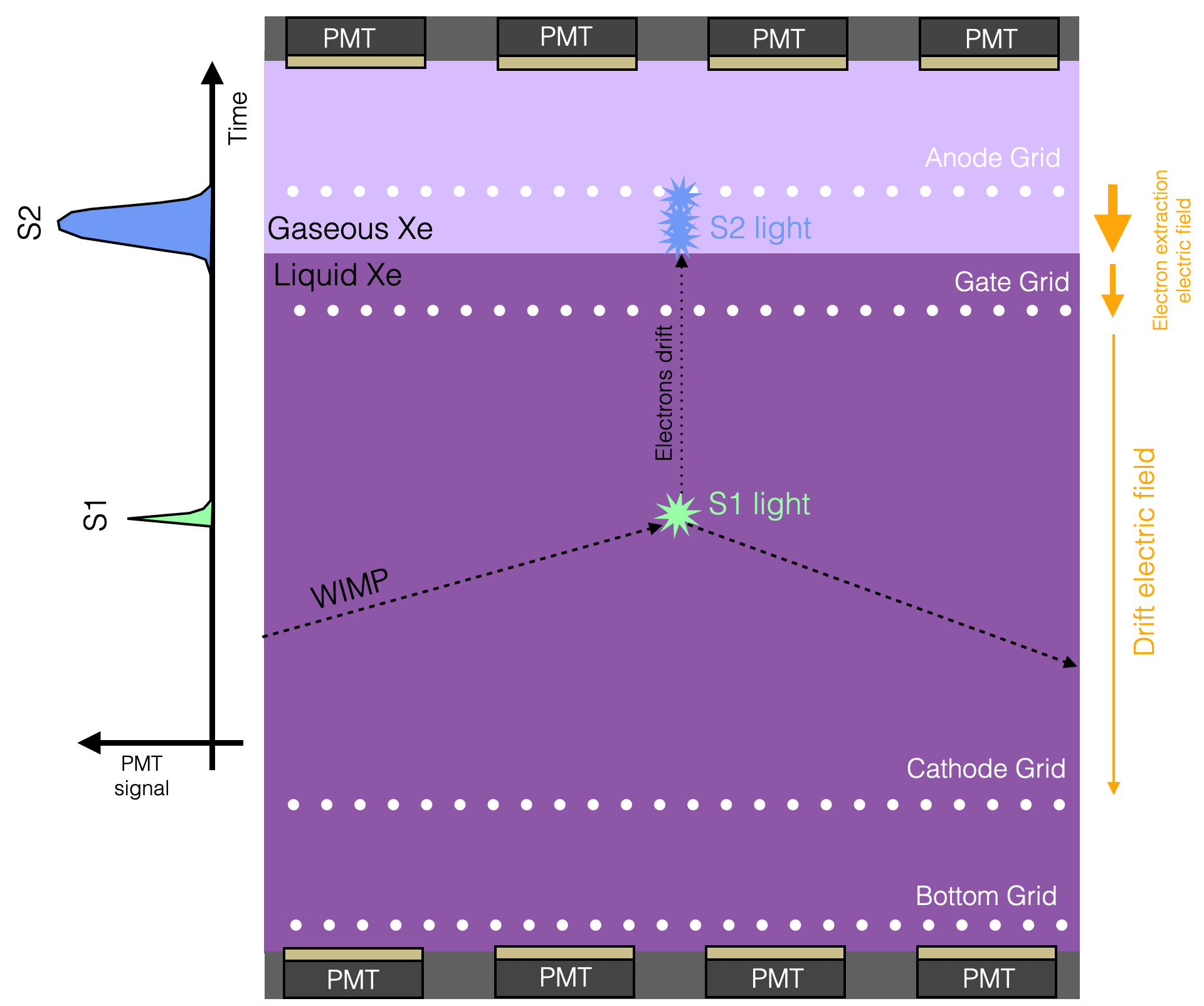
A simple diagram of the operational principle of a dual-phase xenon TPC. During an interaction, S1 light (green) and S2 light (blue) are produced, and a fraction of each may be seen by the PMT arrays at the top and bottom of the detector. Note that this diagram is not to scale, and that LZ has many more than 4 PMTs in each array.

The detector at the heart of LZ is a cylindrical dual-phase xenon time projection chamber (TPC). This is composed of a 7 tonne liquid xenon target and a small region of gaseous xenon above. The operational principle is as follows. When a WIMP or background scatter occurs, a small amount of kinetic energy is given to a xenon nucleus (or atomic electron). This causes the xenon atom to ricochet around the area near the site of the scatter, converting its energy into the production of prompt scintillation photons, freed (ionization) electrons, and heat.

A number of the prompt scintillation photons can be detected by the photomultiplier tubes (PMTs) at the top and bottom of the detector. The ionization electrons drift upward in an externally applied electric field, and upon reaching the liquid surface, are pulled into the gas and create electroluminescence light in a stronger electric field. This electroluminescence creates a delayed "S2" signal. The externally-created electric fields are created by a set of four high voltage electrode grids: the bottom, the cathode, the gate, and the anode.

Taken together, the S1 and S2 enable precise 3D reconstruction of the position of an interaction in the xenon. Because the S2 happens very close to the upper PMT array, it alone can give a good sense of where in XY (i.e. relative to the detector axis) the interaction has occurred. The time difference between the prompt S1 and delayed S2 is a proxy for the depth of the interaction: by using the drift velocity of electrons in xenon at a given electric field, one can convert the drift time to a physical depth, or Z position. Together, this XYZ position permits one to identify a quiet inner fiducial volume for sensitive WIMP searches. It also enables discrimination between WIMP-like single-site interactions and background-like multi-site interactions, like those from neutrons or gamma rays.

Note that unlike other kinds of time projection chambers, such as those used in neutrino experiments like MicroBooNE, the ionization signal here is fully captured via the S2 light - no current is directly measured by electrodes.

== WIMP searches ==
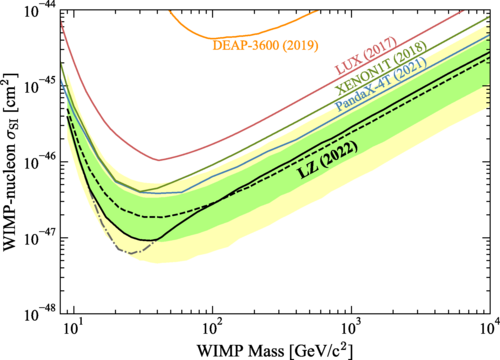
Upper limits for WIMP-nucleon elastic cross sections from selected experiments as reported by the LZ experiment in July 2023.

In July 2022, the LZ collaboration published in a preprint its first upper limit on the spin-independent WIMP-nucleon scattering cross section, using approximately 60 live days worth of data.

On 28 July 2023, the LZ experiment's first results of its searches for WIMPs, previously released as a preprint, were published in Physical Review Letters, excluding cross sections above 9.2×10^{−48} cm^{2} at 36 GeV with 90% confidence level, jointly on the same date XENON published its first results too excluding cross sections above 2.58×10^{−47} cm^{2} at 28 GeV with 90% confidence level. As of 26 August 2024, the Experiment had worked for 280 days (with the aim of 1,000 days) without finding evidence of 'dark matter', but tightening the limits on its properties so far.

=== Event LZ230616 ===
On 1 September 2026, the LZ collaboration announced that on 16 June 2023, the experiment had observed a single event "with characteristics consistent with a nuclear recoil of 248 ± 23 (stat) ± 23 (sys) keV, in a region where the known background expectation is low." In a conference presentation and associated preprint prepared for submission to Physical Review Letters, the collaboration reported a global significance for the event of 2.6σ when accounting for look-elsewhere effects, with a maximum local significance of 3.4σ across the models tested.

Although future analysis is required to confirm or refute the event as a genuine dark matter detection—the event's statistical significance does not clear the 5σ threshold of a "discovery" in particle physics—the event's high recoil energy is consistent with weakly interacting massive particle (WIMP) models in which WIMPs have either different internal energy states or couplings with ordinary matter that vary with momentum.

The collaboration describes the event as its most compelling potential dark matter signal to date, while emphasizing that additional data are needed to determine whether it represents a genuine dark matter interaction.
