= Large Underground Xenon experiment =

Dark matter detection experiment

Coordinates: 44.352°N 103.751°W

The Large Underground Xenon experiment (LUX) aimed to directly detect weakly interacting massive particle (WIMP) dark matter interactions with ordinary matter on Earth. Despite the wealth of (gravitational) evidence supporting the existence of non-baryonic dark matter in the Universe, dark matter particles in our galaxy have never been directly detected in an experiment. LUX utilized a 370 kg liquid xenon detection mass in a time-projection chamber (TPC) to identify individual particle interactions, searching for faint dark matter interactions with unprecedented sensitivity.

The LUX experiment, which cost approximately $10 million to build, was located 1,510 m (4,950 ft) underground at the Sanford Underground Laboratory (SURF, formerly the Deep Underground Science and Engineering Laboratory, or DUSEL) in the Homestake Mine (South Dakota) in Lead, South Dakota. The detector was located in the Davis campus, former site of the Nobel Prize-winning Homestake neutrino experiment led by Raymond Davis. It was operated underground to reduce the background noise signal caused by high-energy cosmic rays at the Earth's surface.

The detector was decommissioned in 2016 and is now on display at the Sanford Lab Homestake Visitor Center.

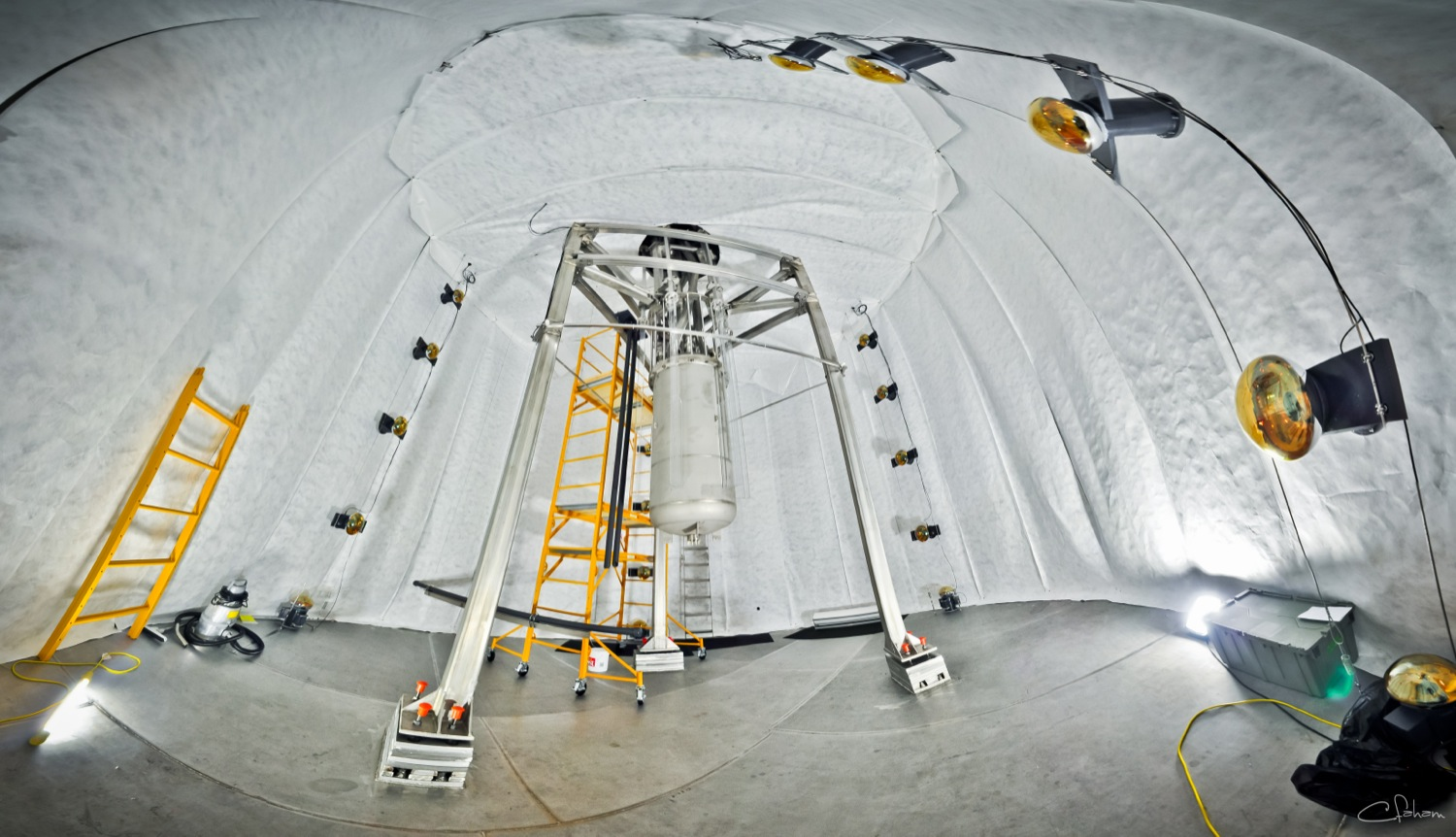
The Large Underground Xenon experiment installed 1,480 m (4,850 ft) underground inside a 260 m^{3} (70,000 US gal) water tank shield. The experiment was a 370 kg liquid xenon time projection chamber that aimed to detect the faint interactions between WIMP dark matter and ordinary matter.

== Detector principle ==
The detector was isolated from background particles by a surrounding water tank and the earth above. This shielding reduced cosmic rays and radiation interacting with the xenon.

Interactions in liquid xenon generate 175 nm ultraviolet photons and electrons. These photons were immediately detected by two arrays of 61 photomultiplier tubes at the top and bottom of the detector. These prompt photons were the S1 signal. Electrons generated by the particle interactions drifted upwards towards the xenon gas by an electric field. The electrons were pulled in the gas at the surface by a stronger electric field, and produced electroluminescence photons detected as the S2 signal. The S1 and subsequent S2 signal constituted a particle interaction in the liquid xenon.

The detector was a time-projection chamber (TPC), using the time between S1 and S2 signals to find the interaction depth since electrons move at constant velocity in liquid xenon (around 1–2 km/s, depending on the electric field). The x-y coordinate of the event was inferred from electroluminescence photons at the top array by statistical methods (Monte Carlo and maximum likelihood estimation) to a resolution under 1 cm.

Particle interactions inside the LUX detector produced photons and electrons. The photons ($\gamma$), moving at the speed of light, were quickly detected by the photomultiplier tubes. This photon signal was called S1. An electric field in the liquid xenon drifted the electrons towards the liquid surface. A much higher electric field above the liquid surface pulled the electrons out of the liquid and into the gas, where they procued electroluminescence photons (in the same way that neon sign produces light). The electroluminescence photons were detected by the photomultiplier tubes as the S2 signal. A single particle interaction in the liquid xenon could be identified by the pair of an S1 and an S2 signal.

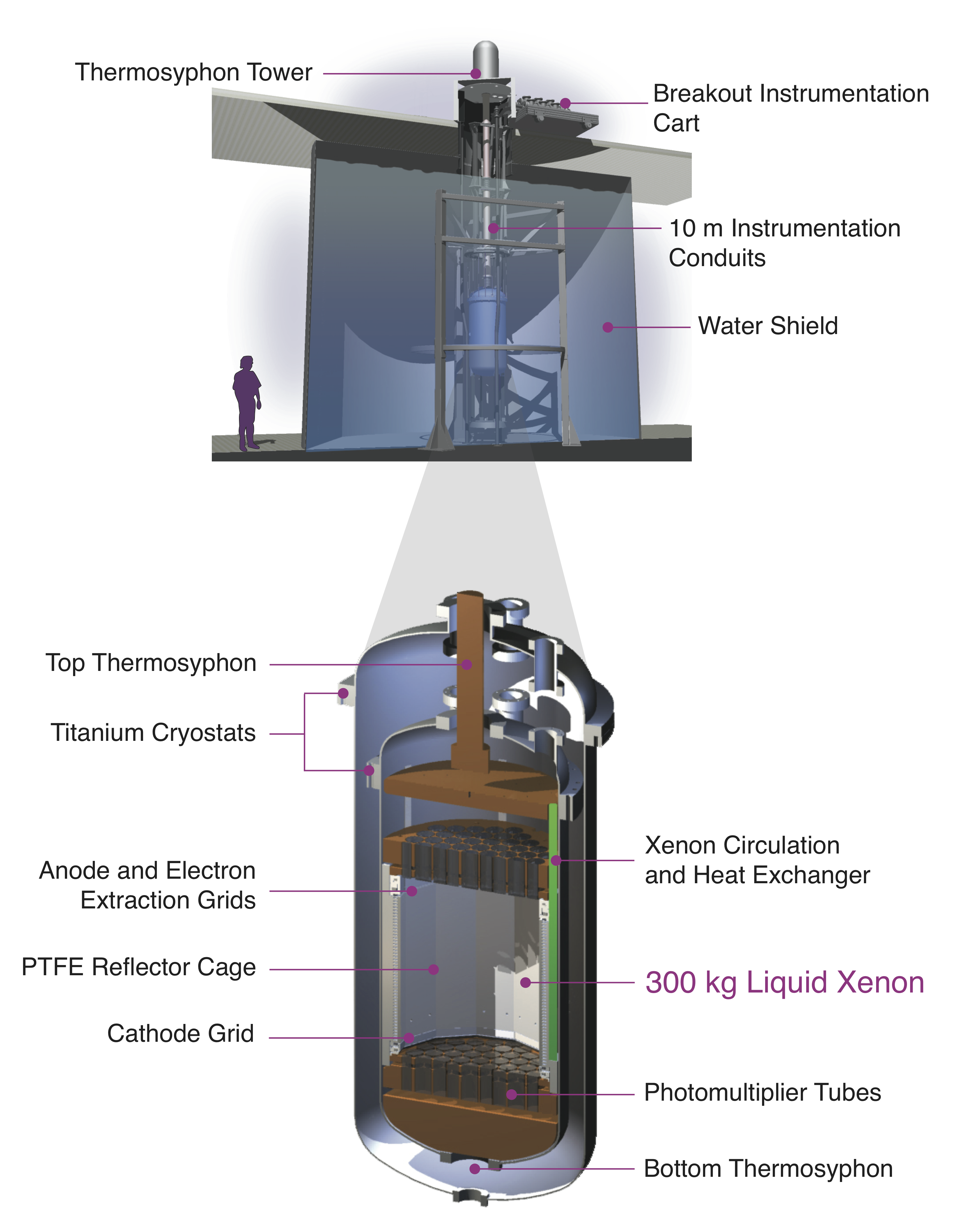
Schematic of the Large Underground Xenon (LUX) detector. The detector consisted of an inner cryostat filled with 370 kg of liquid xenon (300 kg in the inner region, called the "active volume") cooled to −100 °C. 122 photomultiplier tubes detected light generated inside the detector. The LUX detector had an outer cryostat that provided vacuum insulation. An 8-meter-diameter by 6-meter-high water tank shielded the detector from external radiation, such as gamma rays and neutrons.

== Finding dark matter ==
WIMPs would be expected to interact exclusively with the liquid xenon nuclei, resulting in nuclear recoils that would appear very similar to neutron collisions. In order to single out WIMP interactions, neutron events must be minimized, through shielding and ultra-quiet building materials.

In order to discern WIMPs from neutrons, the number of single interactions must be compared to multiple events. Since WIMPs are expected to be so weakly interacting, most would pass through the detector unnoticed. Any WIMPs that interact will have negligible chance of repeated interaction. Neutrons, on the other hand, have a reasonably large chance of multiple collisions within the target volume, the frequency of which can be accurately predicted. Using this knowledge, if the ratio of single interactions to multiple interactions exceeds a certain value, the detection of dark matter may be reliably inferred.

== Collaboration ==
The LUX collaboration was composed of over 100 scientists and engineers across 27 institutions in the US and Europe. LUX was composed of the majority of the US groups that collaborated in the XENON10 experiment, most of the groups in the ZEPLIN III experiment, the majority of the US component of the ZEPLIN II experiment, and groups involved in low-background rare event searches such as Super Kamiokande, SNO, IceCube, Kamland, EXO and Double Chooz.

The LUX experiment's co-spokesmen were Richard Gaitskell from Brown University (who acted as co-spokesman from 2007 on) and Daniel McKinsey from University of California, Berkeley (who acted as co-spokesman from 2012 on). Tom Shutt from Case Western Reserve University was LUX co-spokesman between 2007 and 2012.

== Status ==
Detector assembly began in late 2009. The LUX detector was commissioned overground at SURF for a six-month run. The assembled detector was transported underground from the surface laboratory in a two-day operation in the summer of 2012 and began data taking April 2013, presenting initial results Fall 2013. It was decommissioned in 2016.

The next-generation follow-up experiment, the 7-ton LUX-ZEPLIN has been approved, expected to begin in 2020.

== Results ==
Initial unblinded data taken April to August 2013 were announced on October 30, 2013. In an 85 live-day run with 118 kg fiducial volume, LUX obtained 160 events passing the data analysis selection criteria, all consistent with electron recoil backgrounds. A profile likelihood statistical approach shows this result is consistent with the background-only hypothesis (no WIMP interactions) with a p-value of 0.35. This was the most sensitive dark matter direct detection result in the world, and ruled out low-mass WIMP signal hints such as from CoGeNT and CDMS-II. These results struck out some of the theories about WIMPs, allowing researchers to focus on fewer leads.

In the final run from October 2014 to May 2016, at four times its original design sensitivity with 368 kg of liquid xenon, LUX saw no signs of dark matter candidate—WIMPs. According to Ethan Siegel, the results from LUX and XENON1T have provided evidence against the supersymmetric "WIMP Miracle" strong enough to motivate theorists towards alternate models of dark matter.
