= Gold Run (South Dakota) =

Stream in South Dakota, U.S.

Coordinates: 44°21′34″N 103°44′20″W

Gold Run is a stream in the U.S. state of South Dakota.

Gold Run was named for the valuable deposits of gold in the area.

== See also ==
- List of rivers of South Dakota
