= Gino Isidori =

Italian physicist (born 1968)

- Born: 1968 (age 57–58); Rome
- Occupations: Theoretical physicist, academic and author

Academic background
- Education: PhD., Physics; Laurea., Physics
- Alma mater: Sapienza University of Rome

Gino Isidori (born 1968) is an Italian theoretical physicist, academic and author. He is a professor of Theoretical Physics at the University of Zurich, where he also leads a research group, and is a member of the Science Policy Committee of the CERN Laboratory in Geneva.

Isidori is most known for his work on fundamental interactions, including the Higgs boson, the mechanism of quark-flavor mixing, the metastability of the Standard Model vacuum, the hypotheses of Minimal Flavor Violation and Flavor Deconstruction, and theoretical predictions for rare particle processes. His publications comprise research articles and books including New Physics In B Decays and the chapter about Flavor Physics in The Standard Theory of Particle Physics. He served as Editor-in-Chief for The European Physics Journal C from 2011 to 2017. He has received awards such as the 2009 Hans Senior Fellowship from the Institute for Advanced Study of the Technical University of Munich and the ERC Advanced Grant from the European Research Council in 2019.

== Education and early career ==
Isidori completed his undergraduate and graduate degrees at the Sapienza University of Rome, followed by a PhD in Physics under the supervision of Luciano Maiani in 1996. He became a Visiting Scientist at the SLAC National Accelerator Laboratory in 1997 and served as Postdoctoral Fellow at CERN from 2000 to 2002.

== Career ==
In 2000, Isidori assumed a research position at INFN Laboratories in Frascati, which he held until 2014. He was appointed INFN Research Director in 2008, while also being a Guest Professor at Scuola Normale Superiore in Pisa (2007), a Senior Fellow at the Institute for Advanced Study at the Technical University of Munich (2009), and a Scientific Associate at CERN (2011–2013). Since 2014, he has held the position of Professor of Theoretical Physics in the Physics Department at the University of Zurich and has been a member of the Science Policy Committee of the CERN Laboratory in Geneva since 2021.

Concurrently to his academic activity, he planned and featured in the YouTube series How Particle Theory Works (2018–2021), served as a Scientific Consultant for the TV movie Einstein (2007), and participated in the outreach efforts of Scienza per Tutti magazine.

== Research ==
Isidori has contributed to the field of theoretical physics by focusing on the theoretical and phenomenological investigation of fundamental interactions, formulating extensions of the Standard Model able to address its low-energy successes and resolve its theoretical issues above the TeV energy range. Before the discovery of the Higgs boson, with Giovanni Ridolfi and Alessandro Strumia, he performed the first analysis of the stability of the Higgs potential beyond the semi-classical approximation. By means of a further improvement of this analysis, after the discovery of the Higgs boson in 2012 it was possible to demonstrate that the Standard Model ground state is not absolutely stable, but is sufficiently long-lived compared to the age of the Universe.

Isidori played a key role in elucidating the mechanism of flavor mixing in extensions of the Standard Model, and its possible links to the origin of quark and lepton masses. In a collaborative study with Gian Giudice and others, he proposed the hypothesis of Minimal Flavor Violation (MFV) as a general mechanism to explain why precision measurements in B, D and K-meson physics do not reveal yet deviations from the Standard Model. He also extended this concept to the lepton sector, linking the size of possible flavor violations in charged leptons to neutrino properties. Together with Riccardo Barbieri and others, in 2011, he demonstrated that an alternative to MFV is the hypothesis of a minimally broken U(2)^{3}, a general framework to describe the quark-flavor structure of extensions of the Standard Model where third generation fermions plays a special role. Beside proposing specific mechanisms to describe flavor violations in extensions of the Standard Model, he highlighted the relevance of flavor-violating processes in constraining the scale of new physics in general terms. In 2017, he introduced a three-site Pati–Salam gauge model to attempt to explain the origin of the flavor hierarchies, the quantization of the electric charge, and the experimental hints of deviations from the Standard Model observed at that time in various B decays (so-called B anomalies). According to him, while the experimental significance of the B anomalies has diminished in the last few years, the idea of flavor non-universal gauge interactions, or Flavor Deconstruction, pioneered in the three-site Pati–Salam model has opened a new direction to address both the stability of the Higgs sector and the origin of quark and lepton mass hierarchies.

Beside formulating hypotheses about physics beyond the Standard Model, Isidori also contributed to precise estimates of various flavor-changing processes within the Standard Model. These include the precise assessment of radiative corrections in the tests of lepton flavor universality in $B \rightarrow K \ell^+$ and $B \rightarrow K^* \ell^+ \ell^-$ decays, the model-independent description of long-distance dynamics in $K^+ \rightarrow \pi^+ \ell^+ \ell^-$ and $K_S \rightarrow \pi^0 \ell^+ \ell^-$ decays, and the estimate of non-perturbative contributions to $K \rightarrow \pi \nu \bar{\nu}$. He also calculated non-perturbative corrections associated to charm re-scattering in $B \rightarrow X_s e^+ e^-$ decays, $B \rightarrow X_s \gamma$ and $B \rightarrow X_s \nu \bar{\nu}$ decays, demonstrating that these effects can be controlled to a few % accuracy.

== Awards and honors ==
- 2009 – Hans Fischer Senior Fellowship, Technical University of Munich
- 2019 – ERC Advanced Grant, European Research Council

== Bibliography ==
=== Books and book chapters ===
- Handbook of LHC Higgs Cross Sections: 4. Deciphering the Nature of the Higgs Sector (2016)
- The Standard Theory of Particle Physics (2016) ISBN 978-9814733502
- New Physics in B Decays (2022) ISBN 978-9811251290

=== Selected articles ===
- d'Ambrosio, G.; Giudice, G.F.; Isidori, G.; Strumia, A. (2002). "Minimal flavour violation: An effective field theory approach". Nuclear Physics B. 645 (1–2): 155–187. arXiv:hep-ph/0207036. Bibcode:2002NuPhB.645..155D. doi:10.1016/S0550-3213(02)00836-2.
- Degrassi, Giuseppe; Di Vita, Stefano; Elias-Miró, Joan; Espinosa, José R.; Giudice, Gian F.; Isidori, Gino; Strumia, Alessandro (2012). "Higgs mass and vacuum stability in the Standard Model at NNLO". Journal of High Energy Physics (8) 98. arXiv:1205.6497. Bibcode:2012JHEP...08..098D. doi:10.1007/JHEP08(2012)098.
- Elias-Miró, Joan; Espinosa, José R.; Giudice, Gian F.; Isidori, Gino; Riotto, Antonio; Strumia, Alessandro (2012). "Higgs mass implications on the stability of the electroweak vacuum". Physics Letters B. 709 (3): 222–228. arXiv:1112.3022. Bibcode:2012PhLB..709..222E. doi:10.1016/j.physletb.2012.02.013.
- Bordone, Marzia; Isidori, Gino; Pattori, Andrea (2016). "On the standard model predictions for $R_K$ and $R_{K^*}$". The European Physical Journal C. 76 (8) 440. arXiv:1605.07633. doi:10.1140/epjc/s10052-016-4274-7.
- Buttazzo, Dario; Greljo, Admir; Isidori, Gino; Marzocca, David (2017). "B-physics anomalies: A guide to combined explanations". Journal of High Energy Physics (11) 44. arXiv:1706.07808. Bibcode:2017JHEP...11..044B. doi:10.1007/JHEP11(2017)044.
- Bordone, Marzia; Cornella, Claudia; Fuentes-Martín, Javier; Isidori, Gino (2018). "A three-site gauge model for flavor hierarchies and flavor anomalies". Physics Letters B. 779: 317–323. arXiv:1712.01368. Bibcode:2018PhLB..779..317B. doi:10.1016/j.physletb.2018.02.011.
- Isidori, Gino; Wilsch, Felix; Wyler, Daniel (2024). "The standard model effective field theory at work". Reviews of Modern Physics. 96 (1) 015006. arXiv:2303.16922. Bibcode:2024RvMP...96a5006I. doi:10.1103/RevModPhys.96.015006.
