= 2011 OPERA faster-than-light neutrino anomaly =

2011 experiment which mistakenly seemed to show faster-than-light travel

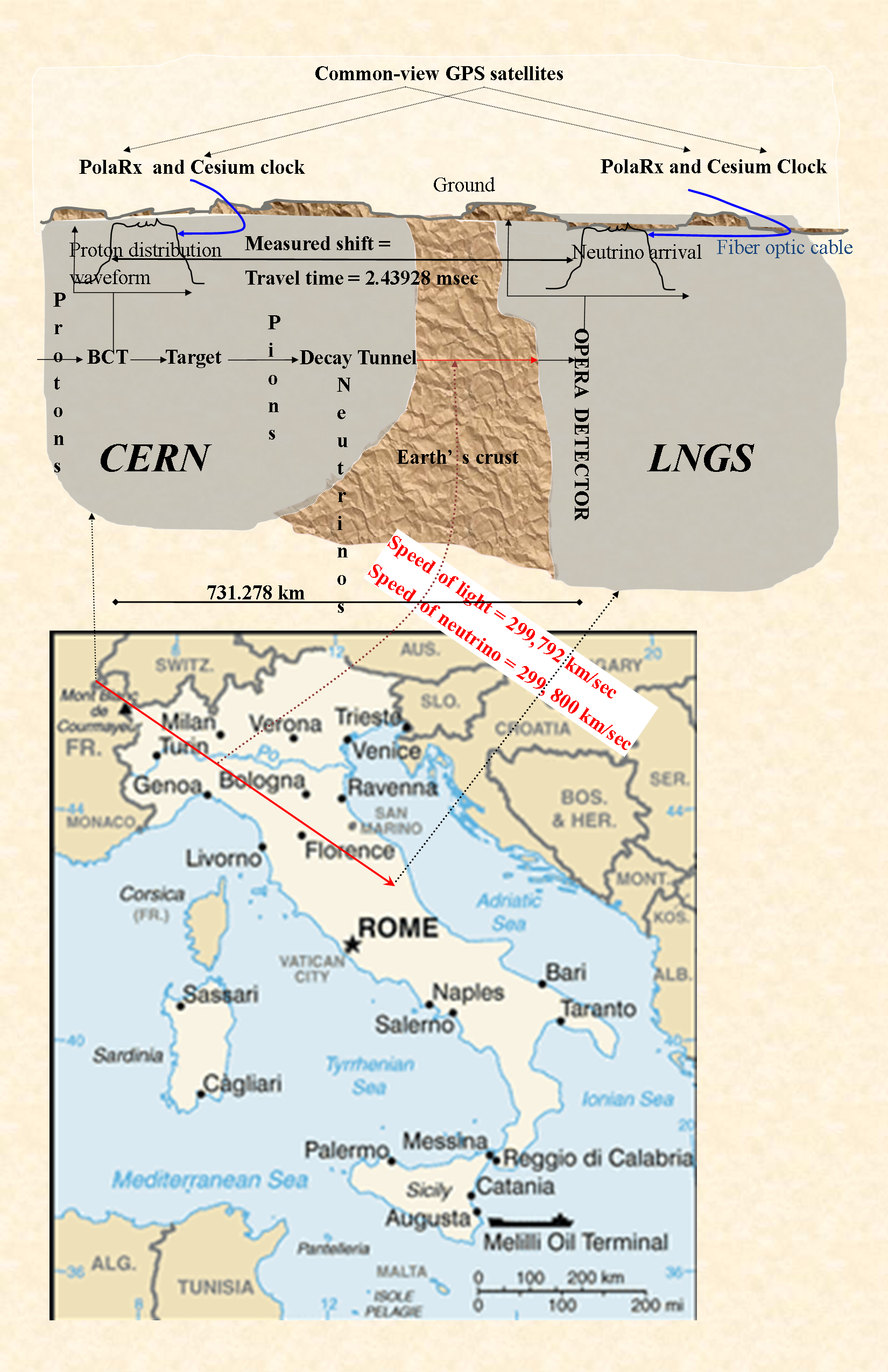
Fig. 1 What OPERA saw. Leftmost is the proton beam from the CERN SPS accelerator. It passes the beam current transformer (BCT), hits the target, creating first, pions and then, somewhere in the decay tunnel, neutrinos. The red lines are the CERN Neutrinos to Gran Sasso (CNGS) beam to the LNGS lab where the OPERA detector is. The proton beam is timed at the BCT. The left waveform is the measured distribution of protons, and the right that of the detected OPERA neutrinos. The shift is the neutrino travel time. Distance traveled is roughly 731 km. At the top are the GPS satellites providing a common clock to both sites, making time comparison possible. Only the PolaRx GPS receiver is above-ground, and fiber cables bring the time underground.

In 2011, the Oscillation Project with Emulsion-tRacking Apparatus (OPERA) experiment mistakenly observed neutrinos appearing to travel faster than light. Even before the source of the error was discovered, the result was considered anomalous because speeds higher than that of light in vacuum are generally thought to violate special relativity, a cornerstone of the modern understanding of physics for over a century. (Note: Many sources describe faster-than-light (FTL) as violating special relativity (SR): (Reich (2011c); Cho (2011a); Choi (2011)). Other reliable sources disagree, though; for FTL not necessarily violating SR, see "Tachyon" (2011).)

On June 8, 2012, after further research and analysis, CERN research director Sergio Bertolucci declared that the speed of neutrinos is consistent with that of light. The press release, made from the 25th International Conference on Neutrino Physics and Astrophysics in Kyoto, states that the original OPERA results were wrong, due to equipment failures.

On July 12, 2012, OPERA updated their paper by including the new sources of errors in their calculations. They found agreement of neutrino speed with the speed of light.

== Detection ==
The experiment created a form of neutrinos, muon neutrinos, at CERN's older SPS accelerator, on the Franco–Swiss border, and detected them at the LNGS lab in Gran Sasso, Italy. OPERA researchers used common-view GPS, derived from standard GPS, to measure the times and place coordinates at which the neutrinos were created and detected. As computed, the neutrinos' average time of flight turned out to be less than what light would need to travel the same distance in vacuum. In a two-week span up to November 6, the OPERA team repeated the measurement with a different way of generating neutrinos, which helped measure travel time of each detected neutrino separately. This eliminated some possible errors related to matching detected neutrinos to their creation time. The OPERA collaboration stated in their initial press release that further scrutiny and independent tests were necessary to definitely confirm or refute the results.

=== First results ===
In a March 2011 analysis of their data, scientists of the OPERA collaboration reported evidence that neutrinos they produced at CERN in Geneva and recorded at the OPERA detector at Gran Sasso, Italy, had traveled faster than light. The neutrinos were calculated to have arrived approximately 60.7 nanoseconds (60.7 billionths of a second) sooner than light would have if traversing the same distance in vacuum. After six months of cross checking, on September 23, 2011, the researchers announced that neutrinos had been observed traveling at faster-than-light speed. Similar results were obtained using higher-energy (28 GeV) neutrinos, which were observed to check if neutrinos' velocity depended on their energy. The particles were measured arriving at the detector faster than light by approximately one part per 40,000, with a 0.2-in-a-million chance of the result being a false positive, assuming the error were entirely due to random effects (significance of six sigma). This measure included estimates for both errors in measuring and errors from the statistical procedure used. It was, however, a measure of precision, not accuracy, which could be influenced by elements such as incorrect computations or wrong readouts of instruments. For particle physics experiments involving collision data, the standard for a discovery announcement is a five-sigma error limit, looser than the observed six-sigma limit.

The preprint of the research stated "[the observed] deviation of the neutrino velocity from c (the speed of light in vacuum) would be a striking result pointing to new physics in the neutrino sector" and referred to the "early arrival time of CNGS muon neutrinos" as an "anomaly". OPERA spokesperson Antonio Ereditato explained that the OPERA team had "not found any instrumental effect that could explain the result of the measurement". James Gillies, a spokesperson for CERN, said on September 22 that the scientists were "inviting the broader physics community to look at what they [had] done and really scrutinize it in great detail, and ideally for someone elsewhere in the world to repeat the measurements".

=== Internal replication ===
Fig. 2 Analysis of the internal replication in November. Distribution of the early-arrival values for each detected neutrino with bunched-beam rerun. The mean value is indicated by the red line and the blue band.

In November, OPERA published refined results where they noted their chances of being wrong as even less, thus tightening their error bounds. Neutrinos arrived approximately 57.8 ns earlier than if they had traveled at light-speed, giving a relative speed difference of approximately one part per 42,000 against that of light. The new significance level became 6.2 sigma. The collaboration submitted its results for peer-reviewed publication to the Journal of High Energy Physics.

In the same paper, the OPERA collaboration also published the results of a repeat experiment running from October 21, 2011 to November 7, 2011. They detected twenty neutrinos consistently indicating an early neutrino arrival of approximately 62.1 ns, in agreement with the result of the main analysis.

=== Measurement errors ===
In February 2012, the OPERA collaboration announced two possible sources of error that could have significantly influenced the results.

- A link from a GPS receiver to the OPERA master clock was loose, which increased the delay through the fiber. The glitch's effect was to decrease the reported flight time of the neutrinos by 73 ns, making them seem faster than light.
- A clock on an electronic board ticked faster than its expected 10 MHz frequency, lengthening the reported flight-time of neutrinos, thereby somewhat reducing the seeming faster-than-light effect. OPERA stated the component had been operating outside its specifications.

In March 2012 an LNGS seminar was held, confirming the fiber cable was not fully screwed in during data gathering. LVD researchers compared the timing data for cosmic high-energy muons hitting both the OPERA and the nearby LVD detector between 2007 and 2008, 2008–2011, and 2011–2012. The shift obtained for the 2008–2011 period agreed with the OPERA anomaly. The researchers also found photographs showing the cable had been loose by October 13, 2011.

Correcting for the two newly found sources of error, results for neutrino speed appear to be consistent with the speed of light.

=== End results ===
On July 12, 2012, the OPERA collaboration published the end results of their measurements between 2009 and 2011. The difference between the measured and expected arrival time of neutrinos (compared to the speed of light) was approximately 6.5 ± 15 ns. This is consistent with no difference at all, thus the speed of neutrinos is consistent with the speed of light within the margin of error. Also, the re-analysis of the 2011 bunched beam rerun gave a similar result.

== Independent replication ==
In March 2012, the co-located ICARUS experiment refuted the OPERA results by measuring neutrino velocity to be that of light. ICARUS measured speed for seven neutrinos in the same short-pulse beam OPERA had checked in November 2011, and found them, on average, traveling at the speed of light. The results were from a trial run of neutrino-velocity measurements slated for May.

In May 2012, a new bunched beam rerun was initiated by CERN. Then in June 2012, it was announced by CERN that the four Gran Sasso experiments OPERA, ICARUS, LVD, and BOREXINO measured neutrino speeds consistent with the speed of light, indicating that the initial OPERA result was due to equipment errors.

In addition, Fermilab stated that the detectors for the MINOS project were being upgraded. Fermilab scientists closely analyzed and placed bounds on the errors in their timing system. On June 8, 2012, MINOS announced that according to preliminary results, the neutrino speed is consistent with the speed of light.

== The measurement ==
The OPERA experiment was designed to capture how neutrinos switch between different identities, but Autiero realized the equipment could be used to precisely measure neutrino speed too. An earlier result from the MINOS experiment at Fermilab demonstrated that the measurement was technically feasible. The principle of the OPERA neutrino velocity experiment was to compare travel time of neutrinos against travel time of light. The neutrinos in the experiment emerged at CERN and flew to the OPERA detector. The researchers divided this distance by the speed of light in vacuum to predict what the neutrino travel time should be. They compared this expected value to the measured travel time.

=== Overview ===
The OPERA team used an already existing beam of neutrinos traveling continuously from CERN to LNGS, the CERN Neutrinos to Gran Sasso beam, for the measurement. Measuring speed meant measuring the distance traveled by the neutrinos from their source to where they were detected, and the time taken by them to travel this length. The source at CERN was more than 730 kilometres (450 mi) away from the detector at LNGS (Gran Sasso). The experiment was tricky because there was no way to time an individual neutrino, necessitating more complex steps. As shown in Fig. 1, CERN generates neutrinos by slamming protons, in pulses of length 10.5 microseconds (10.5 millionths of a second), into a graphite target to produce intermediate particles, which decay into neutrinos. OPERA researchers measured the protons as they passed a section called the beam current transducer (BCT) and took the transducer's position as the neutrinos' starting point. The protons did not actually create neutrinos for another kilometer, but because both protons and the intermediate particles moved almost at light speed, the error from the assumption was acceptably low.

The clocks at CERN and LNGS had to be in sync, and for this the researchers used high-quality GPS receivers, backed up with atomic clocks, at both places. This system timestamped both the proton pulse and the detected neutrinos to a claimed accuracy of 2.3 nanoseconds. But the timestamp could not be read like a clock. At CERN, the GPS signal came only to a receiver at a central control room, and had to be routed with cables and electronics to the computer in the neutrino-beam control room which recorded the proton pulse measurement (Fig. 3). The delay of this equipment was 10,085 nanoseconds and this value had to be added to the time stamp. The data from the transducer arrived at the computer with a 580 nanoseconds delay, and this value had to be subtracted from the time stamp. To get all the corrections right, physicists had to measure exact lengths of the cables and the latencies of the electronic devices. On the detector side, neutrinos were detected by the charge they induced, not by the light they generated, and this involved cables and electronics as part of the timing chain. Fig. 4 shows the corrections applied on the OPERA detector side.

Since neutrinos could not be accurately tracked to the specific protons producing them, an averaging method had to be used. The researchers added up the measured proton pulses to get an average distribution in time of the individual protons in a pulse. The time at which neutrinos were detected at Gran Sasso was plotted to produce another distribution. The two distributions were expected to have similar shapes, but be separated by 2.4 milliseconds, the time it takes to travel the distance at light speed. The experimenters used an algorithm, maximum likelihood, to search for the time shift that best made the two distributions to coincide. The shift so calculated, the statistically measured neutrino arrival time, was approximately 60 nanoseconds shorter than the 2.4 milliseconds neutrinos would have taken if they traveled just at light speed. In a later experiment, the proton pulse width was shortened to 3 nanoseconds, and this helped the scientists to narrow the generation time of each detected neutrino to that range. (Note: The CERN-neutrino-to-Gran-Sasso beam citation is from "Upstream from OPERA: extreme attention to detail" (2011); the rest of the description draws heavily on the article by Cho (2011b), and, to some extent, by Cartlidge (2011b).)

=== Measuring distance ===
Distance was measured by accurately fixing the source and detector points on a global coordinate system (ETRF2000). CERN surveyors used GPS to measure the source location. On the detector side, the OPERA team worked with a geodesy group from the Sapienza University of Rome to locate the detector's center with GPS and standard map-making techniques. To link the surface GPS location to the coordinates of the underground detector, traffic had to be partially stopped on the access road to the lab. Combining the two location measurements, the researchers calculated the distance, to an accuracy of 20 cm within the 730 km path.

=== Measuring trip time ===
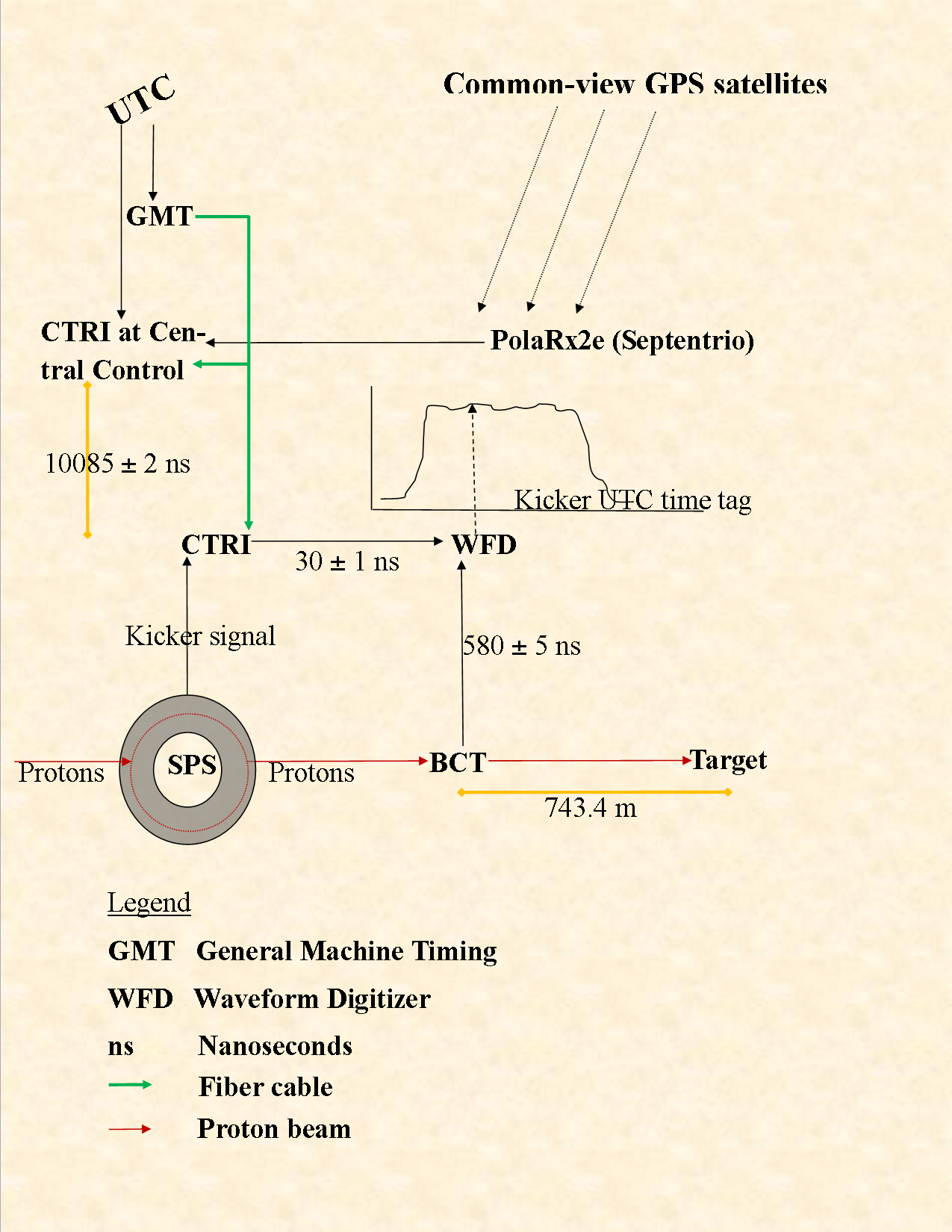
Fig. 3 CERN SPS/CNGS time measuring system. Protons circulate in the SPS till kicked by a signal to the beam current transformer (BCT) and on to the target. The BCT is the origin for the measurement. Both the kicker signal and the proton flux in the BCT get to the waveform digitizer (WFD), the first through the Control Timing Receiver (CTRI). The WFD records the proton distribution. The common CNGS/LNGS clock comes from GPS via the PolaRx receiver and the central CTRI, where the CERN UTC and General Machine Timing (GMT) also arrive. The difference between the two references is recorded. The marker x ± y indicates an x nanosecond delay with a y ns error bound.

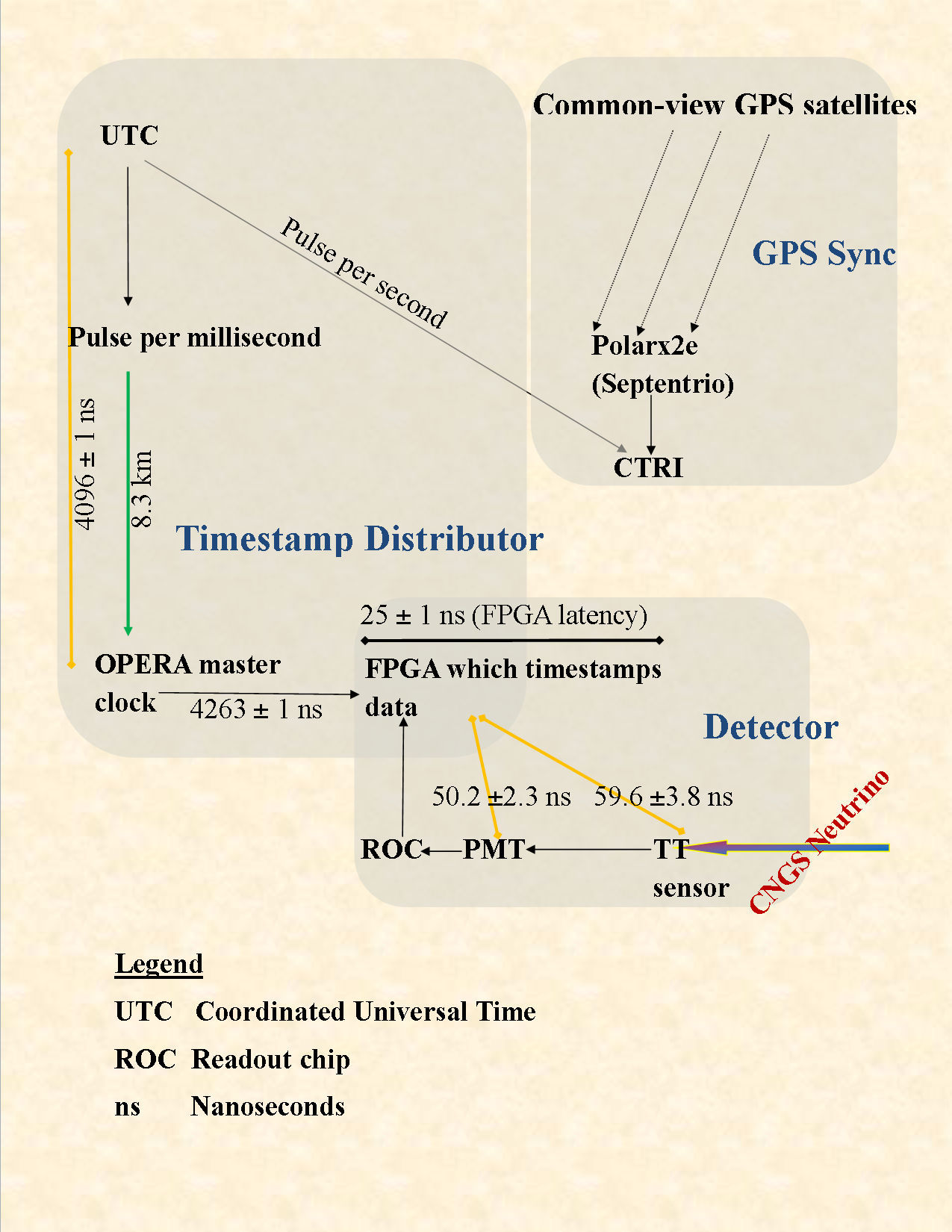
Fig. 4 OPERA time measuring system at LNGS: various delays of the timing chain, and the standard deviations of the error. The top half of the picture is the common GPS clock system (PolaRx2e is the GPS receiver), and the bottom half is the underground detector. Fiber cables bring the GPS clock underneath. The underground detector consists of the blocks from the tt-strip to the FPGA. Errors for each component are shown as x ± y, where x is the delay caused by the component in transmitting time information, and y is the expected bound on that delay.

Timing systems at the two ends of the OPERA experiment

The travel time of the neutrinos had to be measured by tracking the time they were created, and the time they were detected, and using a common clock to ensure the times were in sync. As Fig. 1 shows, the time measuring system included the neutrino source at CERN, the detector at LNGS (Gran Sasso), and a satellite element common to both. The common clock was the time signal from multiple GPS satellites visible from both CERN and LNGS. CERN's beams-department engineers worked with the OPERA team to provide a travel time measurement between the source at CERN and a point just before the OPERA detector's electronics, using accurate GPS receivers. This included timing the proton beams' interactions at CERN, and timing the creation of intermediate particles eventually decaying into neutrinos (see Fig. 3).

Researchers from OPERA measured the remaining delays and calibrations not included in the CERN calculation: those shown in Fig. 4. The neutrinos were detected in an underground lab, but the common clock from the GPS satellites was visible only above ground level. The clock value noted above-ground had to be transmitted to the underground detector with an 8 km fiber cable. The delays associated with this transfer of time had to be accounted for in the calculation. How much the error could vary (the standard deviation of the errors) mattered to the analysis, and had to be calculated for each part of the timing chain separately. Special techniques were used to measure the length of the fiber and its consequent delay, required as part of the overall calculation.

In addition, to sharpen resolution from the standard GPS 100 nanoseconds to the 1 nanosecond range metrology labs achieve, OPERA researchers used Septentrio's precise PolaRx2eTR GPS timing receiver, along with consistency checks across clocks (time calibration procedures) which allowed for common-view time transfer. The PolaRx2eTR allowed measurement of the time offset between an atomic clock and each of the Global Navigation Satellite System satellite clocks. For calibration, the equipment was taken to the Swiss Metrology Institute (METAS). In addition, highly stable cesium clocks were installed both at LNGS and CERN to cross-check GPS timing and to increase its precision. After OPERA found the superluminal result, the time calibration was rechecked both by a CERN engineer and the German Institute of Metrology (PTB). Time-of-flight was eventually measured to an accuracy of 10 nanoseconds. The final error bound was derived by combining the variance of the error for the individual parts.

== The analysis ==
The OPERA team analyzed the results in different ways and using different experimental methods. Following the initial main analysis released in September, three further analyses were made public in November. In the main November analysis, all the existing data were reanalyzed to allow adjustments for other factors, such as the Sagnac effect in which the Earth's rotation affects the distance traveled by the neutrinos. Then an alternative analysis adopted a different model for the matching of the neutrinos to their creation time. The third analysis of November focused on a different experimental setup ('the rerun') which changed the way the neutrinos were created.

In the initial setup, every detected neutrino would have been produced sometime in a 10500 nanoseconds (10.5 microseconds) range, since this was the duration of the proton beam spill generating the neutrinos. It was not possible to isolate neutrino production time further within the spill. Therefore, in their main statistical analyses, the OPERA group generated a model of the proton waveforms at CERN, took the various waveforms together, and plotted the chance of neutrinos being emitted at various times (the global probability density function of the neutrino emission times). They then compared this plot against a plot of the arrival times of the 15223 detected neutrinos. This comparison indicated neutrinos had arrived at the detector 57.8 nanoseconds faster than if they had been traveling at the speed of light in vacuum. An alternative analysis in which each detected neutrino was checked against the waveform of its associated proton spill (instead of against the global probability density function) led to a compatible result of approximately 54.5 nanoseconds.

The November main analysis, which showed an early arrival time of 57.8 nanoseconds, was conducted blind to avoid observer bias, whereby those running the analysis might inadvertently fine-tune the result toward expected values. To this end, old and incomplete values for distances and delays from the year 2006 were initially adopted. With the final correction needed not yet known, the intermediate expected result was also an unknown. Analysis of the measurement data under those 'blind' conditions gave an early neutrino arrival of 1043.4 nanoseconds. Afterward, the data were analyzed again taking into consideration the complete and actual sources of errors. If neutrino and light speed were the same, a subtraction value of 1043.4 nanoseconds should have been obtained for the correction. However, the actual subtraction value amounted to only 985.6 nanoseconds, corresponding to an arrival time 57.8 nanoseconds earlier than expected.

Two facets of the result came under particular scrutiny within the neutrino community: the GPS synchronization system, and the profile of the proton beam spill that generated neutrinos. The second concern was addressed in the November rerun: for this analysis, OPERA scientists repeated the measurement over the same baseline using a new CERN proton beam which circumvented the need to make any assumptions about the details of neutrino production during the beam activation, such as energy distribution or production rate. This beam provided proton pulses of 3 nanoseconds each with up to 524 nanosecond gaps. This meant a detected neutrino could be tracked uniquely to its generating 3 nanoseconds pulse, and hence its start and end travel times could be directly noted. Thus, the neutrino's speed could now be calculated without having to resort to statistical inference.

In addition to the four analyses mentioned earlier—September main analysis, November main analysis, alternative analysis, and the rerun analysis—the OPERA team also split the data by neutrino energy and reported the results for each set of the September and November main analyses. The rerun analysis had too few neutrinos to consider splitting the set further.

== Reception by the physics community ==
After the initial report of apparent superluminal velocities of neutrinos, most physicists in the field were quietly skeptical of the results, but prepared to adopt a wait-and-see approach. Experimental experts were aware of the complexity and difficulty of the measurement, so an extra unrecognized measurement error was still a real possibility, despite the care taken by the OPERA team. However, because of the widespread interest, several well-known experts did make public comments. Nobel laureates Steven Weinberg, George Smoot III, and Carlo Rubbia, and other physicists not affiliated with the experiment, including Michio Kaku, expressed skepticism about the accuracy of the experiment on the basis that the results challenged a long-held theory consistent with the results of many other tests of special relativity. Nevertheless, Ereditato, the OPERA spokesperson, stated that no one had an explanation that invalidated the experiment's results.

Previous experiments of neutrino speed played a role in the reception of the OPERA result by the physics community. Those experiments did not detect statistically significant deviations of neutrino speeds from the speed of light. For instance, Astronomer Royal Martin Rees and theoretical physicists Lawrence Krauss and Stephen Hawking stated neutrinos from the SN 1987A supernova explosion arrived almost at the same time as light, indicating no faster-than-light neutrino speed. John Ellis, theoretical physicist at CERN, believed it difficult to reconcile the OPERA results with the SN 1987A observations. Observations of this supernova restricted 10 MeV anti-neutrino speed to less than 20 parts per billion (ppb) over lightspeed. This was one of the reasons most physicists suspected the OPERA team had made an error.

Physicists affiliated with the experiment had refrained from interpreting the result, stating in their paper:

Despite the large significance of the measurement reported here and the stability of the analysis, the potentially great impact of the result motivates the continuation of our studies in order to investigate possible still unknown systematic effects that could explain the observed anomaly. We deliberately do not attempt any theoretical or phenomenological interpretation of the results.

Theoretical physicists Gian Giudice, Sergey Sibiryakov, and Alessandro Strumia showed that superluminal neutrinos would imply some anomalies in the velocities of electrons and muons, as a result of quantum-mechanical effects. Such anomalies could be already ruled out from existing data on cosmic rays, thus contradicting the OPERA results. Andrew Cohen and Sheldon Glashow predicted that superluminal neutrinos would radiate electrons and positrons and lose energy through vacuum Cherenkov effects, where a particle traveling faster than light decays continuously into other slower particles. However, this energy attrition was absent both in the OPERA experiment and in the co-located ICARUS experiment, which uses the same CNGS beam as OPERA. This discrepancy was seen by Cohen and Glashow to present "a significant challenge to the superluminal interpretation of the OPERA data".

Many other scientific papers on the anomaly were published as arXiv preprints or in peer reviewed journals. Some of them criticized the result, while others tried to find theoretical explanations, replacing or extending special relativity and the Standard Model.

== Discussions within the OPERA collaboration ==
In the months after the initial announcement, tensions emerged in the OPERA collaboration. A vote of no confidence among the more than thirty group team leaders failed, but spokesperson Ereditato and physics coordinator Autiero resigned their leadership positions anyway on March 30, 2012. In a resignation letter, Ereditato claimed that their results were "excessively sensationalized and portrayed with not always justified simplification" and defended the collaboration, stating, "The OPERA Collaboration has always acted in full compliance with scientific rigor: both when it announced the results and when it provided an explanation for them."

== Political controversy ==
In the wake of the discovery, the Italian minister of education Mariastella Gelmini issued a press release praising the experiment and her government for financing the construction of a tunnel between the two laboratories. Useless to the experiment, a literal tunnel never existed, and the press release became a source of jokes in Italy for months.

== See also ==
- Measurements of neutrino speed
- GSI anomaly
