= Lynne Orr =

American physicist

Lynne Hamilton Orr is an American theoretical high energy physicist whose research involves the phenomenology of particles in colliders, particularly focusing on the top quark, Higgs boson, and quantum chromodynamics. She is C.E. Kenneth Mees Professor of Physics at the University of Rochester.

== Education and career ==
Orr studied physics and mathematics at the College of William & Mary, earning a bachelor's degree there in 1982, and stayed on for a 1985 master's degree in physics. She completed her Ph.D. in 1991 at the University of Chicago.

She was a postdoctoral researcher at the University of California, Davis before joining the University of Rochester as an assistant professor of physics in 1993.

== Recognition ==
Orr was named a Fellow of the American Physical Society (APS) in 2005, after a nomination from the APS Division of Particles and Fields, "for contributions to the phenomenology of the top quark and studies of gluon radiation in top quark production and decay". She was given the C.E. Kenneth Mees Professorship at the University of Rochester in 2008.
