= Split supersymmetry =

Particle physics theory

In particle physics, split supersymmetry is a proposal for physics beyond the Standard Model.

== History ==
It was proposed separately in three papers. The first by James Wells in June 2003 in a more modest form that mildly relaxed the assumption about naturalness in the Higgs potential. In May 2004 Nima Arkani-Hamed and Savas Dimopoulos argued that naturalness in the Higgs sector may not be an accurate guide to propose new physics beyond the Standard Model and argued that supersymmetry may be realized in a different fashion that preserved gauge coupling unification and has a dark matter candidate. In June 2004 Gian Giudice and Andrea Romanino argued from a general point of view that if one wants gauge coupling unification and a dark matter candidate, that split supersymmetry is one amongst a few theories that exists.

== Overview ==
The new light (~TeV) particles in Split Supersymmetry (beyond the Standard Models particles) are

Field	Spin	Gauge charges	Name
$\tilde{g}$	$\frac{1}{2}$	$(8,1)_{0}$	gluino
$\tilde{W}$	$\frac{1}{2}$	$(1,3)_{0}$	wino
$\tilde{B}$	$\frac{1}{2}$	$(1,1)_{0}$	bino
$\tilde{H}_u$	$\frac{1}{2}$	$(1,2)_{\frac{1}{2}}$	higgsino
$\tilde{H}_d$	$\frac{1}{2}$	$(1,2)_{-\frac{1}{2}}$	higgsino

The Lagrangian for Split Supersymmetry is constrained from the existence of high energy supersymmetry. There are five couplings in Split Supersymmetry: the Higgs quartic coupling and four Yukawa couplings between the Higgsinos, Higgs and gauginos. The couplings are set by one parameter, $\tan \beta$, at the scale where the supersymmetric scalars decouple. Beneath the supersymmetry breaking scale, these five couplings evolve through the renormalization group equation down to the TeV scale. At a future Linear collider, these couplings could be measured at the 1% level and then renormalization group evolved up to high energies to show that the theory is supersymmetric at an exceedingly high scale.

== Long lived gluinos ==
The striking feature of split supersymmetry is that the gluino becomes a quasi-stable particle with a lifetime that could be up to 100 seconds long. A gluino that lived longer than this would disrupt Big Bang nucleosynthesis or would have been observed as an additional source of cosmic gamma rays. The gluino is long lived because it can only decay into a squark and a quark and because the squarks are so heavy and these decays are highly suppressed. Thus, the decay rate of the gluino can roughly be estimated, in natural units, as ${{m_g}^5\over {m_{sq}}^4}$ where $m_g$ is the gluino rest mass and $m_{sq}$ the squark rest mass. For gluino mass of the order of 1 TeV, the cosmological bound mentioned above sets an upper bound of about $10^9$ GeV on squarks masses.

The potentially long lifetime of the gluino leads to different collider signatures at the Tevatron and the Large Hadron Collider. There are three ways to see these particles:

- Measuring the ratio of momentum to energy or velocity in tracking chambers (dE/dx in the inner tracking chamber or p/v in the outer muon tracking chamber)
- Looking for excess singlet jet events that arise from initial or final state radiation.
- Looking for gluinos that have come to rest inside the detector and later decay. Such an event may occur if the gluinos hadronize to form an exotic hadron which strongly interacts with a nucleon in the detector to create an exotic charged hadron. The latter will decelerate by electromagnetic interaction inside the detector and will eventually stop.

== Advantages and drawbacks ==
Split supersymmetry allows gauge coupling unification as supersymmetry does, because the particles which have masses way beyond the TeV scale play no major role in the unification. These particles are the gravitino - which has a small coupling (of order of the gravitational interaction) to the other particles, and the scalar partners to the standard model fermions - namely, squarks and sleptons. The latter move the beta functions of all gauge couplings together, and do not influence their unification, because in the grand unification theory they form a full SU(5) multiplet, just like a complete generation of particles.

Split supersymmetry also solves the gravitino cosmological problem, because the gravitino mass is much higher than TeV.

The upper bounds on proton decay rate can also be satisfied because the squarks are very heavy as well.

On the other hand, unlike conventional supersymmetry, split supersymmetry does not solve the hierarchy problem which has been a primary motivation for proposals for new physics beyond the Standard Model since 1979. One proposal is that the hierarchy problem is "solved" by assuming fine-tuning due to anthropic reasons.

== History ==
The initial attitude of some of the high energy physics community towards split supersymmetry was illustrated by a parody called supersplit supersymmetry. Often when a new notion in physics is proposed there is a knee-jerk backlash. When naturalness in the Higgs sector was initially proposed as a motivation for new physics, the notion was not taken seriously. After the supersymmetric Standard Model was proposed, Sheldon Glashow quipped that 'half of the particles have already been discovered.' After 25 years, the notion of naturalness had become so ingrained in the community that proposing a theory that did not use naturalness as the primary motivation was ridiculed. Split supersymmetry makes predictions that are distinct from both the Standard Model and the Minimal Supersymmetric Standard Model and the ultimate nature of the naturalness in the Higgs sector will hopefully be determined at future colliders.

Many of the original proponents of naturalness no longer believe that it should be an exclusive constraint on new physics. Kenneth Wilson originally advocated for it, but has recently called it one of his biggest mistakes during his career. Steven Weinberg relaxed the notion of naturalness in the cosmological constant and argued for an environmental explanation for it in 1987. Leonard Susskind, who initially proposed technicolor, is a firm advocate of the notion of a landscape and non-naturalness. Savas Dimopoulos, who initially proposed the supersymmetric Standard Model, proposed split supersymmetry.

== See also ==
- Minimal Supersymmetric Standard Model
- Supersplit supersymmetry
- Supersymmetry
