= Rattazzi =

Rattazzi is a surname, and may refer to the following people:

- Priscilla Rattazzi, Italian photographer
- Riccardo Rattazzi, Italian theoretical physicist
- Steven Rattazzi, American actor
- Susanna Agnelli Rattazzi (1922–2009), Italian politician (also known as the Countess Rattazzi)
- Urbano Rattazzi (1808–1873), Italian statesman
