= Supersplit supersymmetry =

Supersplit supersymmetry was conceived as an April Fool's Day joke in 2005 by a group of young theoretical high energy physicists. It was meant as a parody of split supersymmetry.

The model proposed particles (beyond those of the Standard Model) which are decoupled, leaving no trace at low energies, therefore leaving just the Standard Model. The paper argued that the 30% accuracy of gauge coupling unification in the Standard Model is on par with the 1% accuracy in the MSSM or Split Supersymmetry. It also used the well-known possibility that a Peccei-Quinn axion could be the dark matter of the universe.

As a serious scientific theory, it leads to no new predictions beyond the Standard Model, and is therefore unverifiable. As a social commentary, it demonstrates the uneasiness in the high energy physics community about the direction some model building is heading.

Despite the original intent as a ridiculous proposal, the original paper has been cited by few theoretical physicists.

In 2011, a paper by Giudice and Strumia has presented the same idea under the name 'high scale supersymmetry'.
