= Einstein-aether theory =

Modification of general relativity

In physics the Einstein-aether theory, also called aetheory, is the name coined in 2004 for a modification of general relativity that has a preferred reference frame and hence violates Lorentz invariance. These generally covariant theories describes a spacetime endowed with both a metric and a unit timelike vector field named the aether. The aether in this theory is "a Lorentz-violating vector field" unrelated to older luminiferous aether theories; the "Einstein" in the theory's name comes from its use of Einstein's general relativity equation.

== Relation to other theories of gravity ==
An Einstein-aether theory is an alternative theory of gravity that adds a vector field to the theory of general relativity. There are also scalar field modifications, including Brans–Dicke theory, all included with Horndeski's theory. Going the other direction, there are theories that add tensor fields, under the name Bimetric gravity or both scalar and vector fields can be added, as in Tensor–vector–scalar gravity.

== History ==
The name "Einstein-aether theory" was coined in 2004 by T. Jacobson and D. Mattingly. This type of theory originated in the 1970s with the work of C.M.Will and K. Nordtvedt Jr. on gravitationally coupled vector field theories.

In the 1980's Maurizio Gasperini added a scalar field, which intuitively corresponded to a universal notion of time, to the metric of general relativity. Such a theory will have a preferred reference frame, that in which the universal time is the actual time.

In 2000, Ted Jacobson and David Mattingly developed a model that allows the consequences of preferred frames to be studied. Their theory contains less information than that of Gasperini, instead of a scalar field giving a universal time it contains only a unit vector field which gives the direction of time. Thus observers who follow the aether at different points will not necessarily age at the same rate in the Jacobson–Mattingly theory. In 2008 Ted Jacobson presented a status report on Einstein-aether theory.

== Breaking Lorentz symmetry ==
The existence of a preferred, dynamical time vector breaks the Lorentz symmetry of the theory, more precisely it breaks the invariance under boosts. This symmetry breaking may lead to a Higgs mechanism for the graviton which would alter long distance physics, perhaps yielding an explanation for recent supernova data which would otherwise be explained by a cosmological constant. The effect of breaking Lorentz invariance on quantum field theory has a long history leading back at least to the work of Markus Fierz and Wolfgang Pauli in 1939. Recently it has regained popularity with, for example, the paper Effective Field Theory for Massive Gravitons and Gravity in Theory Space by Nima Arkani-Hamed, Howard Georgi and Matthew Schwartz. Einstein-aether theories provide a concrete example of a theory with broken Lorentz invariance and so have proven to be a natural setting for such investigations.

== Action ==
The action of the Einstein-aether theory is generally taken to consist of the sum of the Einstein–Hilbert action with a Lagrange multiplier λ that ensures that the time vector is a unit vector and also with all of the covariant terms involving the time vector u but having at most two derivatives.

In particular it is assumed that the action may be written as the integral of a local Lagrangian density

$$S=\frac{1}{16\pi G_N}\int d^4x\sqrt{-g}\mathcal L$$

where $G_N$ is Newton's constant and $g$ is a metric with Minkowski signature. The Lagrangian density is

$$\mathcal L=-R-K^{ab}_{mn}\nabla_a u^m\nabla_bu^n-\lambda (g_{ab}u^au^b-1).$$

Here $R$ is the Ricci scalar, $\nabla$ is the covariant derivative and the tensor $K$ is defined by

$$K^{ab}_{mn}=c_1g^{ab}g_{mn}+
c_2\delta^a_m\delta^b_n
+c_3\delta^a_n\delta^b_m+c_4u^au^bg_{mn}.$$

Here the $c_i$ are dimensionless adjustable parameters of the theory.

== Solutions ==
=== Stars ===
Several spherically symmetric solutions to ae-theory have been found. Most recently Christopher Eling and Ted Jacobson have found solutions resembling stars and solutions resembling black holes.

In particular, they demonstrated that there are no spherically symmetric solutions in which stars are constructed entirely from the aether. Solutions without additional matter always have either naked singularities or else two asymptotic regions of spacetime, resembling a wormhole but with no horizon. They have argued that static stars must have static aether solutions, which means that the aether points in the direction of a timelike killing vector.

=== Black holes and potential problems ===
However this is difficult to reconcile with static black holes, as at the event horizon there are no timelike Killing vectors available and so the black hole solutions cannot have static aethers. Thus when a star collapses to form a black hole, somehow the aether must eventually become static even very far away from the collapse.

In addition the stress tensor does not obviously satisfy the Raychaudhuri equation, one needs to make recourse to the equations of motion. This is in contrast with theories with no aether, where this property is independent of the equations of motion.

== Experimental constraints ==
In a 2005 paper, Nima Arkani-Hamed, Hsin-Chia Cheng, Markus Luty and Jesse Thaler have examined experimental consequences of the breaking of boost symmetries inherent in aether theories. They have found that the resulting Goldstone boson leads to, among other things, a new kind of Cherenkov radiation.

In addition they have argued that spin sources will interact via a new inverse square law force with a very unusual angular dependence. They suggest that the discovery of such a force would be very strong evidence for an aether theory, although not necessarily that of Jacobson, et al.

== See also ==
- Aether theories
- Modern searches for Lorentz violation
