= Riccardo Rattazzi =

Italian theoretical physicist and professor

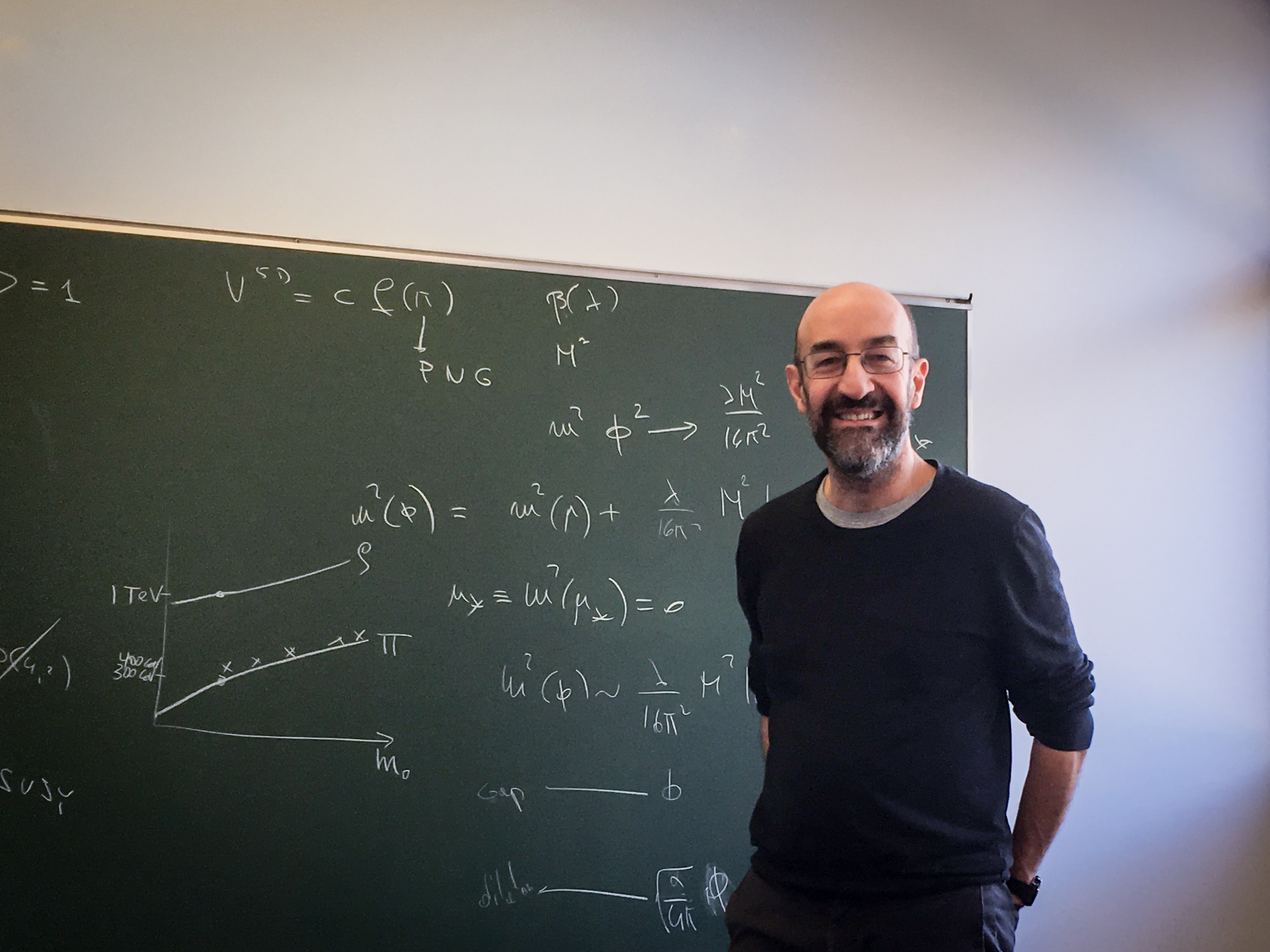
- Born: 1964 (age 61–62); Novara
- Education: Scuola Normale Superiore di Pisa
- Known for: Quantum field theory Beyond the Standard Model; Supersymmetry; Anomaly mediation Cosmology; Galileons; Conformal bootstrap
- Scientific career
- Fields: Theoretical high energy physics
- Workplaces: École Polytechnique Fédérale de Lausanne
- Doctoral advisor: Riccardo Barbieri

Riccardo Rattazzi (born 1964) is an Italian theoretical physicist and a professor at the École Polytechnique Fédérale de Lausanne. His main research interests are in physics beyond the Standard Model and in cosmology.

== Career ==
Rattazzi studied physics at the Scuola Normale Superiore di Pisa and at the University of Pisa, where he received the Laurea cum laude in 1987. He carried out graduate research at the Scuola Normale Superiore di Pisa under the guidance of Riccardo Barbieri. He held postdoctoral positions at the University of California, Berkeley (1992-1993), at the Rutgers University (1993-1996), and at CERN (1996-1998). In 1998, he became a permanent researcher at the Instituto Nazionale di Fisica Nucleare in Pisa. From 2001 to 2006, he was a junior staff member of the theoretical physics department at CERN. Since 2006 he holds a professorship of physics at the École Polytechnique Fédérale de Lausanne. He's also a Distinguished Visiting Research Chair at the Perimeter Institute of Theoretical Physics.

On 7 October 2024, a conference in honour of Rattazzi's 60th birthday took place at the EPFL.

== Main scientific discoveries ==
In 1998, together with Gian Giudice, Markus Luty and Hitoshi Murayama, Rattazzi discovered the anomaly mediated supersymmetry breaking, a subtle quantum mechanical mechanism which contributes to the gaugino masses in supergravity.

In 1999, together with Giudice and James Wells, Rattazzi carried out the first detailed study of the collider signatures of the large extra dimension scenarios of TeV-scale gravity.

In 2001, together with Alberto Zaffaroni, Rattazzi gave the holographic description of the Randall-Sundrum solution of the hierarchy problem, as well as interpreted the Goldberger-Wise mechanism in terms of dimensional transmutation.

In 2004, together with Barbieri, Alex Pomarol and Alessandro Strumia, Rattazzi laid out a conceptually clear and practically useful framework for the analysis of the combined electroweak precision data of the low- and high-energy phases of the LEP experiments.

In 2006, together with Allan Adams, Nima Arkani-Hamed, Sergei Dubovsky and Alberto Nicolis, Rattazzi discovered surprising inconsistencies which may be present in the effective Lagrangians in quantum field theory. These inconsistencies cannot be observed in empty space and at low energies, but they become apparent as violations of causality when many field quanta are present, or when one attempts to extend the theory to arbitrarily high energies.

In 2007, together with Giudice, Christoph Grojean and Pomarol, Rattazzi constructed a low-energy effective Lagrangian which encapsulated general properties of composite Higgs boson models in a way practically useful for the upcoming LHC experiments.

In 2008, together with Slava Rychkov, Erik Tonni and Alessandro Vichi, Riccardo Rattazzi found the first practical implementation of the conformal bootstrap method in four-dimensional conformal field theories. While this work was motivated by physics beyond the standard model, it also proved influential in other areas of theoretical physics such as string theory and statistical physics.

In 2009, together with Nicolis and Enrico Trincherini, Rattazzi discovered the galileons, a new class of derivatively coupled scalar field theories invariant under the Galilean transformations. These theories have since proved useful in the theoretical study of early-universe cosmology and of dark energy.
