= Stefania Gori =

Italian physicist

Stefania Gori (born 1983) is an Italian theoretical particle physicist whose research aims at exploring phenomena in high energy physics that go beyond the Standard Model, including dark matter, axions, symmetry breaking, and the physics of the Higgs boson. Educated in Italy and Germany, she works in the US as a professor of physics at the University of California, Santa Cruz.

== Education and career ==
Gori was born in Pisa in 1983, and studied physics at the University of Pisa, receiving a bachelor's degree in 2005, a master's degree in 2007, and a licenciate through the Scuola Normale Superiore in 2008, under the supervision of Riccardo Barbieri. She continued her studies at the Technical University of Munich, with the support of a Marie-Curie Ph.D. Fellowship, and completed her Ph.D. there in 2010. Her doctoral dissertation, Randall–Sundrum models vs supersymmetry: the different flavor signatures, was supervised by Andrzej Buras.

After postdoctoral research at the University of Chicago, Argonne National Laboratory, and the Perimeter Institute for Theoretical Physics in Canada, she became an assistant professor at the University of Cincinnati in 2016. She has been on the faculty at the University of California, Santa Cruz since 2018; she was promoted to associate professor in 2022 and full professor in 2024.

== Recognition ==
In 2017, Gori received a National Science Foundation Career Award.

In 2024, Gori and her coauthor Wolfgang Altmannshofer were given Frontiers of Science Award in particle-physics phenomenology at the International Congress of Basic Science.

Gori was named as a Fellow of the American Physical Society (APS) in 2025, after a nomination from the APS Division of Particle and Fields, "for seminal contributions to particle physics phenomenology beyond the Standard Model, particularly the physics of Higgs bosons, neutrinos, and light dark matter, and for inspiring and pioneering experimental efforts to advance the search for new physics phenomena".
