= John Ellis (physicist, born 1946) =

British physicist

John Ellis CBE FRS HonFInstP
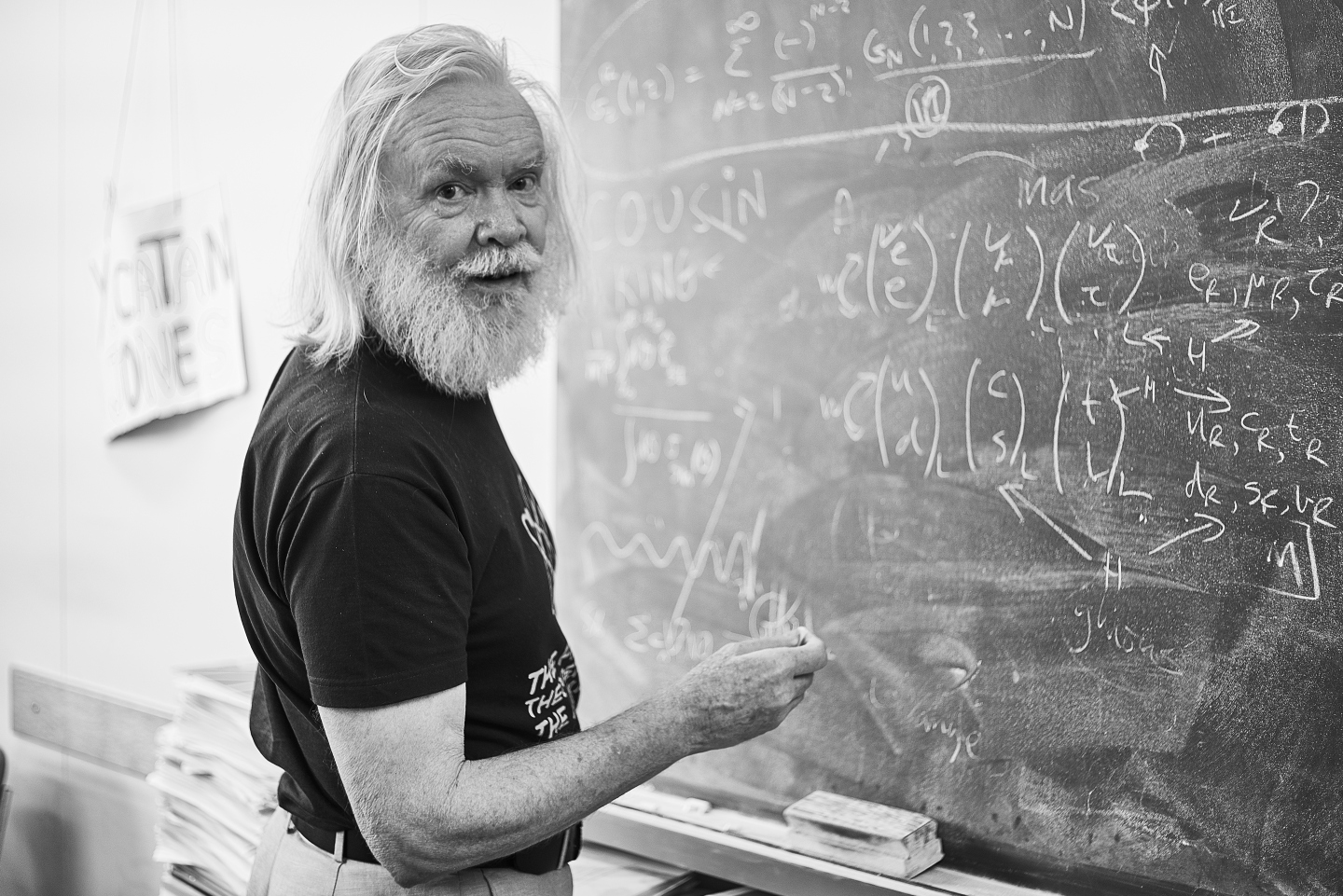
- Born: 1 July 1946 (age 80); Hampstead, London, England, UK
- Education: King's College, Cambridge
- Known for: Proposing how to discover the gluon and the Higgs boson; Coining the term Penguin diagram; Popularizing the term "Theory of Everything"
- Awards: Mayhew Prize (1968); Maxwell Medal and Prize (1982); Paul Dirac Medal and Prize (2005)
- Scientific career
- Fields: Particle physics
- Workplaces: King's College London; CERN
- Thesis: Approximate symmetries of hadrons
- Doctoral advisor: Bruno Renner

Jonathan Richard "John" Ellis CBE FRS HonFInstP (born 1 July 1946) is a British-Swiss theoretical physicist.

After completing his secondary education at Highgate School, he attended King's College, Cambridge from 1964, earning his PhD in theoretical (high-energy) particle physics in 1971, after having spent the academic year 1970/71 as a visiting student at CERN. After one-year post-doc positions in the SLAC Theory Group and at Caltech, he went back to CERN in 1973, first as a research fellow and from 1974 as a staff member, where he remained until he reached the fixed retirement age of 65. Since 2010 Ellis is Clerk Maxwell Professor of Theoretical Physics at King's College London, but continues to work at CERN holding a visiting scientist appointment.

Ellis' activities at CERN have been wide-ranging in addition to his research. He was twice Deputy Division Leader for the theory ("TH") division, and served as Division Leader for 1988–1994. He was a member of the committees that selected experiments at the LEP and LHC accelerators and participated in early studies of possible future colliders such as CLIC and FCC. In the early 2000s he advised successive CERN Directors-General on relations with non-member states. He was also the first chair of CERN's Equal Opportunities Advisory Panel.

== Scientific research ==
Ellis' research interests focus on the phenomenological aspects of particle physics, and he has also made important contributions to astrophysics, cosmology and quantum gravity. Most of his publications relate directly to experiment, from interpreting measurements and the results of searches for new particles, to exploring the physics that could be done with future accelerators. He was one of the pioneers of research at the interface between particle physics and cosmology, which has since become a sub-specialty of its own: particle astrophysics.

Ellis' early research centred on the phenomenology of gauge theories. Working with Dimitri Nanopoulos and Mary Gaillard, he proposed in 1976 the so-called "Higgs-strahlung" process in which a Higgs boson is radiated from a Z-boson (this proved to be the best way to search for the Higgs boson at the Large Electron–Positron Collider) and calculated Higgs decay into Z photons, which was its most distinctive signature at the LHC. In the same year, he estimated the direct CP-violation contribution to rare neutral kaon decays (which was later observed by the NA31 and NA48 experiments at CERN). Also in 1976, he published a paper suggesting the "glue-strahlung" technique for finding the gluon in e^{+}e^{−} annihilations. The following year he predicted the mass of the bottom quark on the basis of Grand Unified Theory, before this quark was observed in experiment. In 1978 he published a frequently cited general paper on such theories, with Andrzej J. Buras, Gaillard and Nanopoulos.

In the 1980s, Ellis became a leading advocate of models of supersymmetry. In one of his earliest works, he showed that the lightest supersymmetric particle is a natural dark matter candidate. In 1990 he showed that early LEP data favoured supersymmetric models of Grand Unification. The following year, he showed that radiative corrections to the mass of the lightest Higgs boson in minimal supersymmetric models increased that mass beyond the reach of the Large Electron–Positron Collider (LEP) searches. Ellis and collaborators later pioneered the analysis of so-called "benchmark scenarios" meant to illustrate the range of phenomenology to be expected from supersymmetric models; such analyses have played a major role in evaluating the promise of various future accelerator options.

In parallel to his investigations of supersymmetric phenomenology, Ellis has also advocated phenomenological probes of quantum gravity and string theory. These probes include direct tests of quantum mechanics with the CPLEAR Collaboration and the derivation of Grand Unified Theories from string theory. In this vein, his work on tests of the constancy of the velocity of light and models of string cosmology separately received first prizes from the Gravity Research Foundation.

In 1996, he and collaborators suggested searching for anomalous radioactive isotopes in geological deposits, which could have been deposited by a nearby supernova explosion. Several experiments have subsequently detected the isotopes iron-60 and plutonium-244, indicating that one or more astrophysical explosions occurred within 100 parsec of the Earth within the past few million years.

Following the discovery of the Higgs boson in 2012, Ellis and his then PhD student Tevong You analysed its properties. The citation for the Nobel Prize for Peter Higgs and François Englert contains a citation, "Beyond any reasonable doubt, it is a Higgs boson", from one of their papers. Ellis has subsequently been one of the leading opponents of the Standard Model Effective Field Theory as a technique for analysing Higgs and other relevant data from the LHC and elsewhere.

Since 2019, he has been a leading member of the Atom Interferometry Observatory and Network (AION) in the United Kingdom, which plans to use atom interferometry to search for ultralight dark matter and gravitational waves. In this connection, he has recently (2024) been exploring interpretations and implications of the gravitational wave signal reported by pulsar timing arrays.

An impression of the impact of Ellis' research can be obtained from the INSPIRE-HEP reference system for scientific papers in particle physics and related fields. As of 2024, this data base lists over 1,000 scientific papers of which he is an author; altogether the sum of citations is above 120,000. In 2004 a SPIRES survey ranked him as the second-most cited theoretical physicist. His publications include six papers with over 1000 citations. His h-index for published papers (2024) is 159.

== Support of particle accelerator projects ==
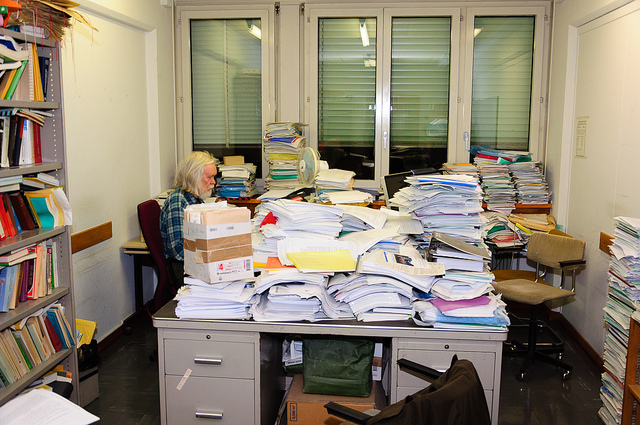
John Ellis in his office at CERN in January 2012

In addition to his theoretical research, John Ellis has been an advocate and supporter of future accelerators, beginning with LEP and the LHC, and extending to the Compact Linear Collider (CLIC), photon colliders, and future proton accelerators. Naturally his theoretical work reflected these connections, as when he showed that data from the Stanford Linear Collider (SLC) and from LEP could be used to predict the masses of the top quark and the Higgs boson.

Concerning the LHC, Ellis played a leading role in the seminal 1984 workshop on physics to be done with such an accelerator. Since then he has written many articles on searches for Higgs bosons and supersymmetric particles at the LHC, both for the particle physics community and at a more popular level.

John Ellis is currently a strong supporter of the FCC option for a future high-energy collider complex.

== Awards and honours ==
- 1968: Mayhew Prize
- 1982: Maxwell Medal
- 1985: Elected Fellow of the Royal Society of London
- 1991: Elected Fellow of the Institute of Physics
- 1999 and 2005: First Award in the Gravity Research Foundation essay competition
- 2005: Paul Dirac Prize of the Institute of Physics
- 2012: Commander of the Order of the British Empire (CBE), Birthday Honours for services to science and technology
- 1994 to present: Elected to 12 honorary doctorates and fellowships

== Outreach and spreading physics around the world ==
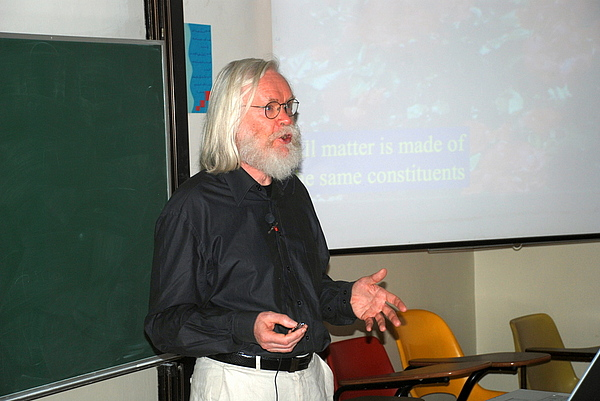
John Ellis at the Birzeit University in November 2008

Ellis is regularly invited to give public lectures on particle physics and related topics, in French, Spanish, Italian as well as English. While at CERN he often gives introductory talks to visitors, including students and teachers.

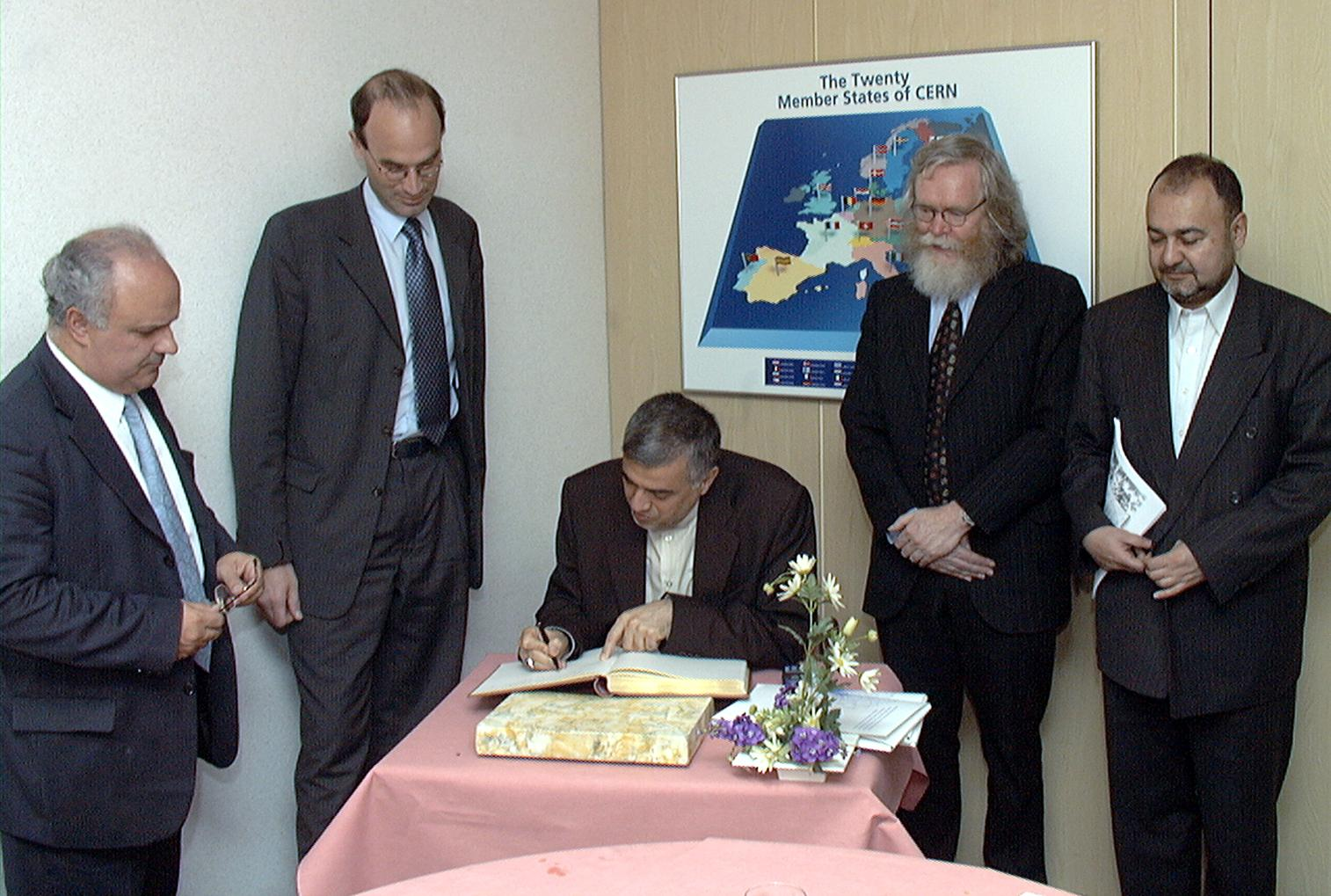
John Ellis in his role as CERN Adviser for Non-Member State Relations

Ellis is known for his efforts to involve non-European nations in CERN scientific activities. In the context of the LHC, he has interacted frequently with physicists, administrators at universities and institutes, and ministers of funding agencies and diplomatic corps from a wide variety of countries, ranging from major CERN partners like the United States, Russia, Japan, Canada, India, Israel, Armenia and China, to states with nascent physics programs such as Azerbaijan, the Baltic republics, Bolivia, Colombia, Croatia, Cyprus, Iran, Madagascar, New Zealand, Pakistan, Romania, Sri Lanka, Vietnam, Palestine, Rwanda, and others. These interactions have contributed towards the international character of CERN and opened the pathways of scientific discourse all around the world.
