= Antonio Ereditato =

Italian physicist (born 1955)

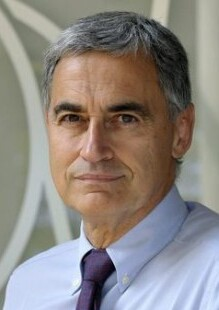
Ereditato in 2015

Antonio Ereditato (born 2 June 1955) is an Italian physicist. He is a Visiting Professor at the University of Chicago, associate researcher at Fermilab, Batavia, United States, and Emeritus professor at the University of Bern, Switzerland, where he has been Director of the Laboratory for High Energy Physics from 2006 to 2020. From 2021 to 2022 Ereditato has been Visiting Professor at the Yale University, United States.

He carried out research activities in the field of experimental neutrino physics, of weak interactions and strong interactions with experiments conducted at CERN, in Japan, at Fermilab in United States and at the LNGS in Italy. Ereditato has accomplished several R&D studies on particle detectors: wire chambers, calorimeters, time projection chambers, nuclear emulsions, detectors for medical applications.

== Biography ==
Ereditato was born on 2 June 1955 in Naples. He obtained the degree in physics (1981) and the PhD (1987) at the University of Naples Federico II. He worked at CNRS Strasbourg, at CERN and at the Istituto Nazionale di Fisica Nucleare in Naples, where he obtained the position of Director of Research since 1998. From 2006 to 2020 Ereditato has been Ordinary Professor of Experimental Particle Physics at the University of Bern.

He has served in several international scientific committees: SPSC, CNGS and LHCC at CERN, and is presently member of the PAC of the Joint Institute for Nuclear Research of Dubna. Ereditato has been also member of the Swiss National Science Foundation. He served in Advisory Committees of international conferences, such as the Calorimetry Conference. Referee and peer review member of international journals and of Funding Agencies, Ereditato is currently Editor-in-Chief of Instruments. He is also member of the Aspen Institute Italia and has been president of SAIS (Association of the Italian Academics in Switzerland).

From 2008 to 2012 Antonio Ereditato has been the spokesperson of the OPERA neutrino experiment that he proposed in 1997 together with Kimio Niwa and Paolo Strolin. The experiment studied neutrino oscillations along the CNGS beam from CERN to the LNGS Gran Sasso Laboratory. On 31 May 2010 Ereditato announced the detection of the first tau-neutrino by OPERA. This was the first indication of the direct appearance of neutrino oscillations. In September 2011 the OPERA Collaboration announced that an anomaly was detected in the measurement of the neutrino velocity, pointing to the possibility of superluminal muon neutrinos, see (mistaken) faster-than-light neutrino anomaly. The source of the anomaly was then found by the OPERA researchers as due to an instrumental problem.

As head of the ATLAS Bern group, Ereditato contributed to the discovery of the Higgs Boson in 2012. In the framework of the T2K experiment in Japan, in 2013 he took part in the discovery of the appearance of neutrino oscillations and with the OPERA collaboration he shared the discovery of tau-neutrino appearance. For these results Ereditato was one of the recipients of the 2016 Breakthrough Prize in Fundamental Physics. He is involved in the United States neutrino program. He has been one of the founders of the DUNE experiment for the high precision study of neutrino oscillations and astroparticle physics. Ereditato's group contributed to the realization of the Near Detector of the experiment with the so-called ArgonCube liquid argon time projection chamber.

== Scientific achievements ==
Ereditato is known for contributions to neutrino physics, calorimetry, and detector development. His early work at CERN included leading trigger and calorimeter studies in the NA10 experiment and CHARM II, contributing to precision electroweak measurements.

He played a key role in calorimeter R&D through the SPACAL project and co-founded the CALOR Conference. He proposed and led detector innovations for the CHORUS experiment, established leading short-baseline neutrino oscillation limits, and was a co-originator of the OPERA experiment, which achieved the first direct observation of ντ appearance.

At the Laboratory for High Energy Physics, he expanded programs in neutrino physics, antimatter studies, and medical applications, contributing to milestone results including the first indication of nonzero θ13 and νe appearance in T2K experiment and the discovery of the Higgs boson with ATLAS experiment. He also pioneered liquid argon detector advances through ARGONTUBE, MicroBooNE, and DUNE, and contributed to antimatter interferometry through AEgIS experiment and QUPLAS.

As full professor of experimental particle physics at the University of Bern from 2006 to 2020, Ereditato transformed Bern into a major international center for neutrino and detector physics. He directed the Laboratory for High Energy Physics, co-directed the Physics Institute, and later served as director of the Albert Einstein Center for Fundamental Physics and deputy dean of the Faculty of Science. Under his leadership Bern became deeply involved in major international collaborations including ATLAS Collaboration, T2K Collaboration, MicroBooNE, SBND, and DUNE. His work contributed to the discovery of the Higgs boson at CERN, the first evidence for nonzero θ_{13} neutrino mixing, the discovery of electron-neutrino appearance, measurements of muon-antineutrino disappearance, and hints for CP violation in neutrino oscillation.

A major focus of Ereditato's later career has been innovation in liquid-argon time projection chamber technology. His ARGONTUBE detector achieved world-record drift-track lengths in liquid argon and pioneered ultraviolet laser calibration methods that became foundational for next-generation neutrino observatories. The Bern led ARGONCUBE project, produced the first proof-of-principle pixelated readout architecture for liquid-argon detectors and became central to detector design for the international DUNE experiment. Ereditato's instrumentation work also extended into antimatter physics, contributing to the first observation of antimatter quantum interferometry through the QUPLAS program, as well as isotope-production systems for the Bern cyclotron laboratory with applications in nuclear medicine.

Ereditato has held numerous institutional leadership roles across global physics governance, including service on CERN's Large Hadron Collider Committee, CERN SPS Committee, the Swiss National Science Foundation Council, Fermilab's International Executive Board for the Long Baseline Neutrino Facility, the U.S. Department of Energy International Neutrino Council, and advisory committees at Dubna and CERN. He has also played influential editorial roles, serving on the boards of New Journal of Physics and Advances in High Energy Physics, and as founding editor-in-chief of Instruments. Ereditato is currently Faculty of the Collegio Europeo di Parma and Chairs the Scientific Committee of the Collegio La Sapienza of the ONAOSI, in Perugia.

His scholarly output includes more than 1,660 scientific papers, over 292,000 citations, and a Google Scholar h-index exceeding 230, placing him among the most highly cited experimental physicists of his generation. He has delivered more than forty invited international conference lectures and supervised dozens of doctoral researchers who have gone on to major careers in international science.

Beyond technical scholarship, Ereditato is a science writer. His books—including Le Particelle Elementari, Ever Smaller, The State of the Art of Neutrino Physics, Il Mio Neutrino, Zitto e Calcola!, Lettera agli Scienziati del Futuro, The New Nuclear Power, Il Sarto e il Calzolaio di Boltzmann have helped make modern particle physics accessible to broader audiences.

== Awards and honors ==
His honors include the Italian Physical Society Young Researcher Prize (1985), the shared 2016 Breakthrough Prize in Fundamental Physics for the contributions to the discovery of neutrino oscillations, the Premio Caccuri for Literature and Science (2017), the Maria Antonia Gervasio Prize for scientific communication (2017), appointment as Officer of the Order of Merit of the Italian Republic (2018), honorary citizenship of Caccuri, the "I Numeri Uno" Prize of the Italian Chamber of Commerce for Switzerland (2021), the shared 2025 Breakthrough Prize in Fundamental Physics recognizing precision measurements and discoveries at the Large Hadron Collider, the 2026 Premio Villa Buitoni for "Courageous Careers".

=== Selected scientific publications ===
- Adam, T., Agafonova, N., Aleksandrov, A., Altinok, O., Ereditato, A., et al. (2012). Measurement of the neutrino velocity with the OPERA detector in the CNGS beam.
- Abe, K., Adam, J., Aihara, H., Akiri, T., Andreopoulos, C., Ereditato, A., et al. (2013). Observation of electron neutrino appearance in a muon neutrino beam.
- Agafonova, N., et al. (Ereditato, A., collaboration spokesperson). (2015). Discovery of tau neutrino appearance in the CNGS neutrino beam with the OPERA experiment. Direct confirmation of νμ→ντ oscillation.
- Ariga, A., Ariga, T., Ereditato, A., et al. (2018). A nuclear emulsion detector for muon radiography of glacier structure.
- DUNE Collaboration (Ereditato, A., co-founder contributor). (2024). DUNE Phase II: Scientific opportunities, detector concepts, technological solutions.

=== Selected books ===
- De Lellis, G., Antonio Ereditato, & Niwa, K. (2011). Nuclear emulsions. Springer.
- Amaldi, E., Braccini, S. (Ed.), Antonio Ereditato (Ed.), & Scampoli, P. (Ed.). (2013). The adventurous life of Friedrich Georg Houtermans, physicist (1903–1966). Springer.
- Antonio Ereditato. (2017). Le particelle elementari. Il Saggiatore.
- Antonio Ereditato. (2018). The state of the art of neutrino physics (Advanced Series on Directions in High Energy Physics, Vol. 28). World Scientific.
- Edoardo Boncinelli, & Antonio Ereditato. (2018). Il cosmo della mente. Il Saggiatore.
- Antonio Ereditato. (2019). Guida turistica per esploratori dello spazio. Il Saggiatore.
- Edoardo Boncinelli, & Antonio Ereditato. (2020). L'infinito gioco della scienza. Il Saggiatore.
- Antonio Ereditato. (2020). Ever smaller. MIT Press.
- Antonio Ereditato. (2021). Un breve viaggio chiamato Terra. Il Saggiatore.
- Edoardo Boncinelli, & Antonio Ereditato. (2022). Tutto si trasforma. Il Saggiatore.
- Antonio Ereditato. (2022). Il mio neutrino. Rubbettino.
- Antonio Ereditato. (2023). Zitto e calcola!. Eurilink University Press.
- Antonio Ereditato. (2023). Lettera agli scienziati del futuro. Il Saggiatore.
- Buono, S., & Antonio Ereditato. (2025). Il nuovo nucleare. EGEA.
- Buono, S., & Antonio Ereditato. (2025). The new nuclear power. EGEA.
- Antonio Ereditato. (2026). Il sarto e il calzolaio di Boltzmann. EGEA
