= Alessandro Strumia =

Italian physicist

- Born: 26 December 1969 (age 56)
- Education: University of Pisa
- Scientific career
- Fields: Flavour physics Vacuum decay Cosmology; Dark matter
- Thesis: Supersymmetric Unification (1995)
- Doctoral advisor: Riccardo Barbieri

Alessandro Strumia (born 26 December 1969) is an Italian physicist at the University of Pisa. His research focuses on high energy physics, beyond the Standard Model, studying the flavour of elementary particle, charge conjugation parity (CP) symmetry violations, and the Higgs boson. In September 2018, Strumia gave a controversial presentation at CERN's first Workshop on High Energy Theory and Gender, where he claimed that male, not female scientists, were the victims of discrimination on the part of universities and has since then also published on political issues within research environments. The presentation led to his suspension from CERN and sanctions from the University of Pisa.

== Education ==
Strumia obtained his PhD in 1995, at the University of Pisa, where his doctoral advisor was Riccardo Barbieri. His thesis was titled Supersymmetric unification.

== Career ==
Strumia's research specialization is in physics beyond the Standard Model. In 1995, with Riccardo Barbieri and Lawrence J. Hall, he studied flavour and CP violations, present in supersymmetric unified theories even in the absence of any flavour or CP violation in the input for the soft-supersymmetry breaking parameters.

He is one of the originators of the idea of Minimal Flavor Violation, a proposal to characterize the effects of flavor transitions in new theories of particle physics. In 2004, together with Riccardo Barbieri, Alex Pomarol and Riccardo Rattazzi, Alessandro Strumia laid out a conceptually clear and practically useful framework for the analysis of the combined electroweak precision data of the low- and high-energy phases of the LEP experiments. After the OPERA experiment reported an observation of neutrinos apparently traveling faster than light, Strumia in collaboration with Gian Giudice and Sergey Sibiryakov showed that superluminal neutrinos would imply some anomalies in the velocities of electrons and muons as a result of quantum-mechanical effects. Such anomalies could be already ruled out from existing data on cosmic rays, thus contradicting the OPERA results.

After the discovery of the Higgs boson, he computed the probability that the Higgs vacuum undergoes quantum tunnelling, finding that the universe is in a critical state which will eventually end in a cosmic collapse. He joined the European Organization for Nuclear Research (CERN)'s theory division as a fellow in 2000, and as a member of the CMS Collaboration, he was a credited coauthor on the paper which announced the Higgs boson discovery; his primary affiliation was Estonia's National Institute of Chemical Physics and Biophysics. Along with Joseph Lykken and other collaborators, he later proposed the "modified naturalness" hypothesis for the Higgs boson's mass.

While at CERN in June 2018, Strumia and Riccardo Torre worked on a new set of algorithms with which to evaluate the impact of published scientific research. Basing their investigation on PageRank used by Google, they proposed a similar system of ranking scientific papers and authors. Researchers had "mixed reaction", suggesting that it would be useful for "lifetime achievement" but possibly subject to "transparency issues". The "simplicity" of current methods of evaluation allows for gaming the system. The difference in Strumia and Torre's approach is that they include what they describe as "second-generation" and later-generation citations in their algorithms. Therefore, not only the original citations of the work are taken into account, but subsequent citations to derivative material also. They named their systems PaperRank and AuthorRank. They also proposed a system called CitationCoin to reduce the effect of groups who "inflate" each other citation count.

== Controversies ==
=== Using pictures of conference slides ===
Marco Cirelli and Alessandro Strumia were amongst multiple teams that used digital photos from a conference presentation by other authors in 2008 in Stockholm for a subsequent publication. The presentation showed a highly anticipated but yet unpublished measurement of the positron fraction in cosmic rays by the PAMELA collaboration.

=== Talk on gender discrimination ===
On 28 September 2018, Strumia gave a presentation at CERN's first Workshop on High Energy Theory and Gender that provoked considerable controversy. Citing an analysis he had performed on data from the InSpire database, he tested the idea that there is a gender bias against women within the academic circles of physics. He claimed that his results suggest that male scientists were victims of discrimination.

On 30 September 2018, CERN released a short statement, removed the slides of Strumia's presentation from its conference website and on 1 October, suspended him from his "invited scientist" position, due to a breach of Code of Conduct (naming a CERN employee in the presentation). On 1 October 2018, the University of Pisa released a statement signaling the opening of an ethical investigation and subsequently sanctioned him.

Strumia's talk was condemned in a public letter titled “High Energy Physics Community Statement” on a website called “Particles for Justice” on 2 October. As of 13 October, it received nearly 4,000 signatures from scientists working in High Energy Physics and related fields, including those of John Ellis, Howard Georgi and David Gross. In response, a rebuttal titled "Justice For Strumia" was published online along with a petition for reinstatement of Strumia. Subsequently, the petition and the list of "2370 signatories from 90 countries" were sent to the director general of CERN receiving "no response". An anonymous commentary on Strumia's talk and the community response was published in Areo magazine.

One supporter of Strumia was the former string theorist Luboš Motl. Physicist Sabine Hossenfelder performed an alternative analysis using a different database and found that after accounting for disproportionately higher rates of women leaving the field the sex differences become negligible. In a later paper, she defended Strumia's publication in the journal Quantitative Science Studies (QSS), calling the findings "significant and robust", while cautioning that the study "cannot reveal the origin of the existing gender differences".

On March 7, 2019, CERN confirmed that Strumia's status as guest professor will not be continued. Following this announcement, Strumia uploaded an unofficial recording of the event on a newly started website, where he claimed that his position had been misrepresented in the media.

In November 2019, the journal Quantitative Science Studies (QSS) announced it would publish Strumia's paper. The journal published the paper in 2021, and in the following issue published four critical commentaries about it, along with Strumia's response to the commentaries.

== See also ==
- Resistance to diversity efforts in organizations
- Variability hypothesis
- Women in STEM fields
- Google's Ideological Echo Chamber
