= Modern searches for Lorentz violation =

Tests of special relativity

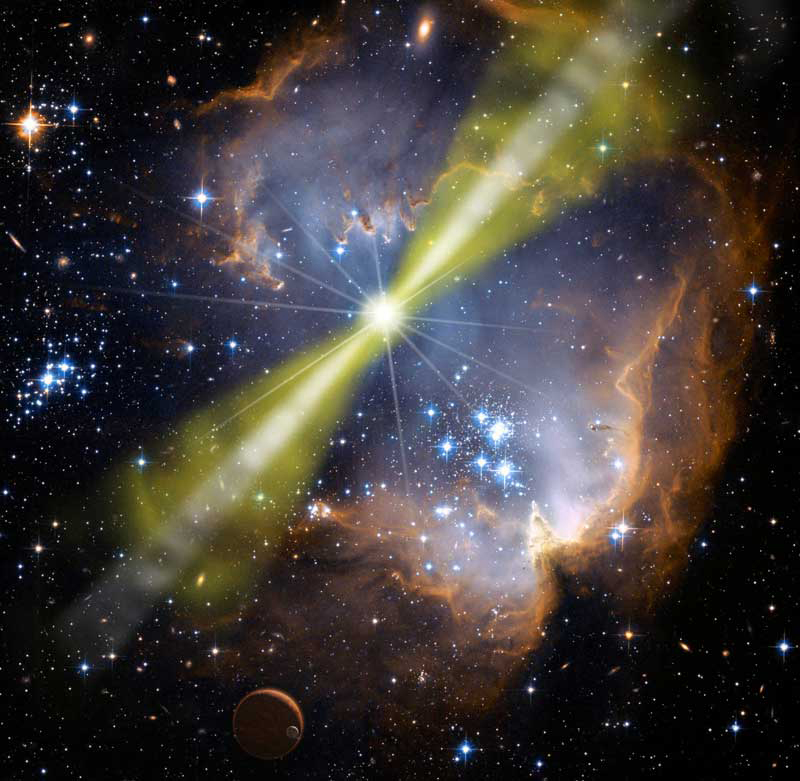
Measurements on light from gamma-ray bursts show that the speed of light does not vary with energy. Artist's conception.

Modern searches for Lorentz violation are scientific studies that look for deviations from Lorentz invariance or symmetry, a set of fundamental frameworks that underpin modern science and fundamental physics in particular. These studies try to determine whether violations or exceptions might exist for well-known physical laws such as special relativity and CPT symmetry, as predicted by some variations of quantum gravity, string theory, and some alternatives to general relativity.

Lorentz violations concern the fundamental predictions of special relativity, such as the principle of relativity, the constancy of the speed of light in all inertial frames of reference, and time dilation, as well as the predictions of the Standard Model of particle physics. To assess and predict possible violations, test theories of special relativity and effective field theories (EFT) such as the Standard-Model Extension (SME) have been invented. These models introduce Lorentz and CPT violations through spontaneous symmetry breaking caused by hypothetical background fields, resulting in some sort of preferred frame effects. This could lead, for instance, to modifications of the dispersion relation, causing differences between the maximal attainable speed of matter and the speed of light.

Both terrestrial and astronomical experiments have been carried out, and new experimental techniques have been introduced. No Lorentz violations have been measured thus far, and exceptions in which positive results were reported have been refuted or lack further confirmations. For discussions of many experiments, see Mattingly (2005). For a detailed list of results of recent experimental searches, see Kostelecký and Russell (2008–2013). For a recent overview and history of Lorentz violating models, see Liberati (2013).

== Assessing Lorentz invariance violations ==
Early models assessing the possibility of slight deviations from Lorentz invariance have been published between the 1960s and the 1990s. In addition, a series of test theories of special relativity and effective field theories (EFT) for the evaluation and assessment of many experiments have been developed, including:

- The parameterized post-Newtonian formalism is widely used as a test theory for general relativity and alternatives to general relativity, and can also be used to describe Lorentz violating preferred frame effects.
- The Robertson-Mansouri-Sexl framework (RMS) contains three parameters, indicating deviations in the speed of light with respect to a preferred frame of reference.
- The c^{2} framework (a special case of the more general THεμ framework) introduces a modified dispersion relation and describes Lorentz violations in terms of a discrepancy between the speed of light and the maximal attainable speed of matter, in presence of a preferred frame.
- Doubly special relativity (DSR) preserves the Planck length as an invariant minimum length-scale, yet without having a preferred reference frame.
- Very special relativity describes space-time symmetries that are certain proper subgroups of the Poincaré group. It was shown that special relativity is only consistent with this scheme in the context of quantum field theory or CP conservation.
- Noncommutative geometry (in connection with noncommutative quantum field theory or the noncommutative standard model) might lead to Lorentz violations.
- Lorentz violations are also discussed in relation to alternatives to general relativity such as loop quantum gravity, emergent gravity, Einstein aether theory, and Hořava–Lifshitz gravity.

However, the Standard-Model Extension (SME) in which Lorentz violating effects are introduced by spontaneous symmetry breaking, is used for most modern analyses of experimental results. It was introduced by Kostelecký and colleagues in 1997 and the following years, containing all possible Lorentz and CPT violating coefficients not violating gauge symmetry. It includes not only special relativity, but the Standard Model and general relativity as well. Models whose parameters can be related to SME and thus can be seen as special cases of it, include the older RMS and c^{2} models, the Coleman-Glashow model confining the SME coefficients to dimension 4 operators and rotation invariance, and the Gambini–Pullin model or the Myers–Pospelov model corresponding to dimension 5 or higher operators of SME.

== Speed of light ==
=== Terrestrial ===
Many terrestrial experiments have been conducted, mostly with optical resonators or in particle accelerators, by which deviations from the isotropy of the speed of light are tested. Anisotropy parameters are given, for instance, by the Robertson–Mansouri–Sexl test theory (RMS). This allows for distinction between the relevant orientation and velocity dependent parameters. In modern variants of the Michelson–Morley experiment, the dependence of light speed on the orientation of the apparatus and the relation of longitudinal and transverse lengths of bodies in motion is analyzed. Also modern variants of the Kennedy–Thorndike experiment, by which the dependence of light speed on the velocity of the apparatus and the relation of time dilation and length contraction is analyzed, have been conducted; the recently reached limit for Kennedy–Thorndike test yields 7 × 10^{−12}. The current precision, by which an anisotropy of the speed of light can be excluded, is at the 10^{−17} level. This is related to the relative velocity between the Solar System and the rest frame of the cosmic microwave background radiation of ~368 km/s (see also Resonator Michelson–Morley experiments).

In addition, the Standard-Model Extension (SME) can be used to obtain a larger number of isotropy coefficients in the photon sector. It uses the even- and odd-parity coefficients (3×3 matrices) $\tilde{\kappa}_{e-}$, $\tilde{\kappa}_{o+}$ and $\tilde{\kappa}_{tr}$. They can be interpreted as follows: $\tilde{\kappa}_{e-}$ represent anisotropic shifts in the two-way (forward and backwards) speed of light, $\tilde{\kappa}_{o+}$ represent anisotropic differences in the one-way speed of counterpropagating beams along an axis, and $\tilde{\kappa}_{tr}$ represent isotropic (orientation-independent) shifts in the one-way phase velocity of light. It was shown that such variations in the speed of light can be removed by suitable coordinate transformations and field redefinitions, though the corresponding Lorentz violations cannot be removed, because such redefinitions only transfer those violations from the photon sector to the matter sector of SME. While ordinary symmetric optical resonators are suitable for testing even-parity effects and provide only tiny constraints on odd-parity effects, also asymmetric resonators have been built for the detection of odd-parity effects. For additional coefficients in the photon sector leading to birefringence of light in vacuum, which cannot be redefined as the other photon effects, see § Vacuum birefringence.

Another type of test of the $\tilde{\kappa}_{o+}$ related one-way light speed isotropy in combination with the electron sector of the SME was conducted by Bocquet et al. (2010). They searched for fluctuations in the 3-momentum of photons during Earth's rotation, by measuring the Compton scattering of ultrarelativistic electrons on monochromatic laser photons in the frame of the cosmic microwave background radiation, as originally suggested by Vahe Gurzadyan and Amur Margarian (for details on that 'Compton Edge' method and analysis see, discussion e.g.).

Author	Year	RMS		SME		
Author	Year	Orientation	Velocity	$\tilde{\kappa}_{e-}$	$\tilde{\kappa}_{o+}$	$\tilde{\kappa}_{tr}$
Michimura et al.	2013				(0.7±1)×10^{−14}	(−0.4±0.9)×10^{−10}
Baynes et al.	2012					(3±11)×10^{−10}
Baynes et al.	2011				(0.7±1.4)×10^{−12}	(3.4±6.2)×10^{−9}
Hohensee et al.	2010			(0.8±0.6)×10^{−16}	(−1.5±1.2)×10^{−12}	(−1.50±0.74)×10^{−8}
Bocquet et al.	2010				≤1.6×10^{−14}	
Herrmann et al.	2009	(4±8)×10^{−12}		(−0.31±0.73)×10^{−17}	(−0.14±0.78)×10^{−13}	
Eisele et al.	2009	(−1.6±6±1.2)×10^{−12}		(0.0±1.0±0.3)×10^{−17}	(1.5±1.5±0.2)×10^{−13}	
Tobar et al.	2009		(−4.8±3.7)×10^{−8}			
Tobar et al.	2009					(−0.3±3)×10^{−7}
Müller et al.	2007			(7.7±4.0)×10^{−16}	(1.7±2.0)×10^{−12}	
Carone et al.	2006					≲3×10^{−8}
Stanwix et al.	2006	(9.4±8.1)×10^{−11}		(−6.9±2.2)×10^{−16}	(−0.9±2.6)×10^{−12}	
Herrmann et al.	2005	(−2.1±1.9)×10^{−10}		(−3.1±2.5)×10^{−16}	(−2.5±5.1)×10^{−12}	
Stanwix et al.	2005	(−0.9±2.0)×10^{−10}		(−0.63±0.43)×10^{−15}	(0.20±0.21)×10^{−11}	
Antonini et al.	2005	(+0.5±3±0.7)×10^{−10}		(−2.0±0.2)×10^{−14}		
Wolf et al.	2004			(−5.7±2.3)×10^{−15}	(−1.8±1.5)×10^{−11}	
Wolf et al.	2004	(+1.2±2.2)×10^{−9}	(3.7±3.0)×10^{−7}			
Müller et al.	2003	(+2.2±1.5)×10^{−9}		(1.7±2.6)×10^{−15}	(14±14)×10^{−11}	
Lipa et al.	2003			(1.4±1.4)×10^{−13}	≤10^{−9}	
Wolf et al.	2003	(+1.5±4.2)×10^{−9}				
Braxmaier et al.	2002		(1.9±2.1)×10^{−5}			
Hils and Hall	1990		6.6×10^{−5}			
Brillet and Hall	1979	≲5×10^{−9}		≲10^{−15}		

=== Solar System ===
Besides terrestrial tests also astrometric tests using Lunar Laser Ranging (LLR), i.e. sending laser signals from Earth to Moon and back, have been conducted. They are ordinarily used to test general relativity and are evaluated using the Parameterized post-Newtonian formalism. However, since these measurements are based on the assumption that the speed of light is constant, they can also be used as tests of special relativity by analyzing potential distance and orbit oscillations. For instance, Zoltán Lajos Bay and White (1981) demonstrated the empirical foundations of the Lorentz group and thus special relativity by analyzing the planetary radar and LLR data.

In addition to the terrestrial Kennedy–Thorndike experiments mentioned above, Müller & Soffel (1995) and Müller et al. (1999) tested the RMS velocity dependence parameter by searching for anomalous distance oscillations using LLR. Since time dilation is already confirmed to high precision, a positive result would prove that light speed depends on the observer's velocity and length contraction is direction dependent (like in the other Kennedy–Thorndike experiments). However, no anomalous distance oscillations have been observed, with a RMS velocity dependence limit of (−5±12)×10^{−5}, comparable to that of Hils and Hall (1990, see table above on the right).

=== Vacuum dispersion ===
Another effect often discussed in connection with quantum gravity (QG) is the possibility of dispersion of light in vacuum (i.e. the dependence of light speed on photon energy), due to Lorentz-violating dispersion relations. This effect should be strong at energy levels comparable to, or beyond the Planck energy E_{Pl} ≈ 1.22×10^{19} GeV, while being extraordinarily weak at energies accessible in the laboratory or observed in astrophysical objects. In an attempt to observe a weak dependence of speed on energy, light from distant astrophysical sources such as gamma ray bursts and distant galaxies has been examined in many experiments. The Fermi-LAT group was able to show that no energy dependence and thus no observable Lorentz violation occurs in the photon sector even beyond the Planck energy, which excludes a large class of Lorentz-violating quantum gravity models.

Name	Year	QG Bounds (GeV)	
Name	Year	95% C.L.	99% C.L.
Vasileiou et al.	2013	> 7.6 × E_{Pl}	
Nemiroff et al.	2012		> 525 × E_{Pl}
Fermi-LAT-GBM	2009	> 3.42 × E_{Pl}	> 1.19 × E_{Pl}
H.E.S.S.	2008	≥ 7.2×10^{17}	
MAGIC	2007	≥ 0.21×10^{18}	
Ellis et al.	2007	≥ 1.4×10^{16}	
Lamon et al.	2007	≥ 3.2×10^{11}	
Martinez et al.	2006	≥ 0.66×10^{17}	
Boggs et al.	2004	≥ 1.8×10^{17}	
Ellis et al.	2003	≥ 6.9×10^{15}	
Ellis et al.	2000	≥ 10^{15}	
Kaaret	1999	> 1.8×10^{15}	
Schaefer	1999	≥ 2.7×10^{16}	
Biller	1999	> 4×10^{16}	

=== Vacuum birefringence ===
Lorentz violating dispersion relations due to the presence of an anisotropic space might also lead to vacuum birefringence and parity violations. For instance, the polarization plane of photons might rotate due to velocity differences between left- and right-handed photons. In particular, gamma ray bursts, galactic radiation, and the cosmic microwave background radiation are examined. The SME coefficients $k_{(V)00}^{(3)}$ and $k_{(V)00}^{(5)}$ for Lorentz violation are given, 3 and 5 denote the mass dimensions employed. The latter corresponds to $\xi$ in the EFT of Meyers and Pospelov by $k_{(V)00}^{(5)} = \frac{3\sqrt{4\pi}\xi}{5m_{\text{P}}}$, $m_\text{P}$ being the Planck mass.

Name	Year	SME bounds		EFT bound, $\xi$
Name	Year	$k_{(V)00}^{(3)}$ (GeV)	$k_{(V)00}^{(5)}$ (GeV^{−1})	EFT bound, $\xi$
Götz et al.	2013		≤ 5.9×10^{−35}	≤ 3.4×10^{−16}
Toma et al.	2012		≤ 1.4×10^{−34}	≤ 8×10^{−16}
Laurent et al.	2011		≤ 1.9×10^{−33}	≤ 1.1×10^{−14}
Stecker	2011		≤ 4.2×10^{−34}	≤ 2.4×10^{−15}
Kostelecký et al.	2009		≤ 1×10^{−32}	≤ 9×10^{−14}
QUaD	2008	≤ 2×10^{−43}		
Kostelecký et al.	2008	= (2.3 ± 5.4)×10^{−43}		
Maccione et al.	2008		≤ 1.5×10^{−28}	≤ 9×10^{−10}
Komatsu et al.	2008	= (1.2 ± 2.2)×10^{−43}		
Kahniashvili et al.	2008	= (2.6 ± 1.9)×10^{−43}		
Cabella et al.	2007	= (2.5 ± 3.0)×10^{−43}		
Fan et al.	2007		≤ 3.4×10^{−26}	≤ 2×10^{−7}
Feng et al.	2006	= (6.0 ± 4.0)×10^{−43}		
Gleiser et al.	2001		≤ 8.7×10^{−23}	≤ 4×10^{−4}
Carroll et al.	1990	≤ 2×10^{−42}		

== Maximal attainable speed ==
=== Threshold constraints ===
Lorentz violations could lead to differences between the speed of light and the limiting or maximal attainable speed (MAS) of any particle, whereas in special relativity the speeds should be the same. One possibility is to investigate otherwise forbidden effects at threshold energy in connection with particles having a charge structure (protons, electrons, neutrinos). This is because the dispersion relation is assumed to be modified in Lorentz violating EFT models such as SME. Depending on which of these particles travels faster or slower than the speed of light, effects such as the following can occur:

- Photon decay at superluminal speed. These (hypothetical) high-energy photons would quickly decay into other particles, which means that high energy light cannot propagate over long distances. So the mere existence of high energy light from astronomic sources constrains possible deviations from the limiting velocity.
- Vacuum Cherenkov radiation at superluminal speed of any particle (protons, electrons, neutrinos) having a charge structure. In this case, emission of Bremsstrahlung can occur, until the particle falls below threshold and subluminal speed is reached again. This is similar to the known Cherenkov radiation in media, in which particles are traveling faster than the phase velocity of light in that medium. Deviations from the limiting velocity can be constrained by observing high energy particles of distant astronomic sources that reach Earth.
- The rate of synchrotron radiation could be modified, if the limiting velocity between charged particles and photons is different.
- The Greisen–Zatsepin–Kuzmin limit could be evaded by Lorentz violating effects. However, recent measurements indicate that this limit really exists.

Since astronomic measurements also contain additional assumptions – like the unknown conditions at the emission or along the path traversed by the particles, or the nature of the particles –, terrestrial measurements provide results of greater clarity, even though the bounds are wider (the following bounds describe maximal deviations between the speed of light and the limiting velocity of matter):

Name	Year	Bounds				Particle	Location
Name	Year	Photon decay	Cherenkov	Synchrotron	GZK	Particle	Location
Stecker	2014		≤ 5×10^{−21}			Electron	Astronomical
Stecker & Scully	2009				≤ 4.5×10^{−23}	UHECR	Astronomical
Altschul	2009			≤ 5×10^{−15}		Electron	Terrestrial
Hohensee et al.	2009	≤ −5.8×10^{−12}	≤ 1.2×10^{−11}			Electron	Terrestrial
Bi et al.	2008				≤ 3×10^{−23}	UHECR	Astronomical
Klinkhamer & Schreck	2008	≤ −9×10^{−16}	≤ 6×10^{−20}			UHECR	Astronomical
Klinkhamer & Risse	2007		≤ 2×10^{−19}			UHECR	Astronomical
Kaufhold et al.	2007		≤ 10^{−17}			UHECR	Astronomical
Altschul	2005			≤ 6×10^{−20}		Electron	Astronomical
Gagnon et al.	2004	≤ −2×10^{−21}	≤ 5×10^{−24}			UHECR	Astronomical
Jacobson et al.	2003	≤ −2×10^{−16}	≤ 5×10^{−20}			Electron	Astronomical
Coleman & Glashow	1997	≤ −1.5×10^{−15}	≤ 5×10^{−23}			UHECR	Astronomical

=== Clock comparison and spin coupling ===
By this kind of spectroscopy experiments – sometimes called Hughes–Drever experiments as well – violations of Lorentz invariance in the interactions of protons and neutrons are tested by studying the energy levels of those nucleons in order to find anisotropies in their frequencies ("clocks"). Using spin-polarized torsion balances, also anisotropies with respect to electrons can be examined. Methods used mostly focus on vector spin interactions and tensor interactions, and are often described in CPT odd/even SME terms (in particular parameters of b_{μ} and c_{μν}). Such experiments are currently the most sensitive terrestrial ones, because the precision by which Lorentz violations can be excluded lies at the 10^{−33} GeV level.

These tests can be used to constrain deviations between the maximal attainable speed of matter and the speed of light, in particular with respect to the parameters of c_{μν} that are also used in the evaluations of the threshold effects mentioned above.

Author	Year	SME bounds			Parameters
Author	Year	Proton	Neutron	Electron	Parameters
Allmendinger et al.	2013		< 6.7×10^{−34}		b_{μ}
Hohensee et al.	2013			(−9.0 ± 11)×10^{−17}	c_{μν}
Peck et al.	2012	<4×10^{−30}	< 3.7×10^{−31}		b_{μ}
Smiciklas et al.	2011		(4.8 ± 4.4)×10^{−32}		c_{μν}
Gemmel et al.	2010		< 3.7×10^{−32}		b_{μ}
Brown et al.	2010	< 6×10^{−32}	< 3.7×10^{−33}		b_{μ}
Altarev et al.	2009		< 2×10^{−29}		b_{μ}
Heckel et al.	2008			(4.0 ± 3.3)×10^{−31}	b_{μ}
Wolf et al.	2006	(−1.8 ± 2.8)×10^{−25}			c_{μν}
Canè et al.	2004		(8.0 ± 9.5)×10^{−32}		b_{μ}
Heckel et al.	2006			< 5×10^{−30}	b_{μ}
Humphrey et al.	2003			< 2×10^{−27}	b_{μ}
Hou et al.	2003			(1.8 ± 5.3)×10^{−30}	b_{μ}
Phillips et al.	2001	< 2×10^{−27}			b_{μ}
Bear et al.	2000		(4.0 ± 3.3)×10^{−31}		b_{μ}

== Time dilation ==
The classic time dilation experiments such as the Ives–Stilwell experiment, the Moessbauer rotor experiments, and the time dilation of moving particles, have been enhanced by modernized equipment. For example, the Doppler shift of lithium ions traveling at high speeds is evaluated by using saturated spectroscopy in heavy ion storage rings. For more information, see Modern Ives–Stilwell experiments.

The current precision with which time dilation is measured (using the RMS test theory), is at the ~10^{−8} level. It was shown, that Ives-Stilwell type experiments are also sensitive to the $\tilde{\kappa}_{tr}$ isotropic light speed coefficient of the SME, as introduced above. Chou et al. (2010) even managed to measure a frequency shift of ~10^{−16} due to time dilation, namely at everyday speeds such as 36 km/h.

Author	Year	Velocity	Maximum deviation from time dilation	Fourth order RMS bounds
Novotny et al.	2009	0.34 c	≤ 1.3×10^{−6}	≤ 1.2×10^{−5}
Reinhardt et al.	2007	0.064 c	≤ 8.4×10^{−8}	
Saathoff et al.	2003	0.064 c	≤ 2.2×10^{−7}	
Grieser et al.	1994	0.064 c	≤ 1×10^{−6}	≤ 2.7×10^{−4}

== CPT and antimatter tests ==
Another fundamental symmetry of nature is CPT symmetry. It was shown that CPT violations lead to Lorentz violations in quantum field theory (even though there are nonlocal exceptions). CPT symmetry requires, for instance, the equality of mass, and equality of decay rates between matter and antimatter.

Modern tests by which CPT symmetry has been confirmed are mainly conducted in the neutral meson sector. In large particle accelerators, direct measurements of mass differences between top- and antitop-quarks have been conducted as well.

Neutral B mesons
Author	Year
LHCb	2016
BaBar	2016
D0	2015
Belle	2012
Kostelecký et al.	2010
BaBar	2008
BaBar	2006
BaBar	2004
Belle	2003

Neutral D mesons
Author	Year
FOCUS	2003

Neutral kaons
Author	Year
KTeV	2011
KLOE	2006
CPLEAR	2003
KTeV	2003
NA31	1990

Top- and antitop quarks
Author	Year
CDF	2012
CMS	2012
D0	2011
CDF	2011
D0	2009

Using SME, also additional consequences of CPT violation in the neutral meson sector can be formulated. Other SME related CPT tests have been performed as well:

- Using Penning traps in which individual charged particles and their counterparts are trapped, Gabrielse et al. (1999) examined cyclotron frequencies in proton-antiproton measurements, and couldn't find any deviation down to 9·10^{−11}.
- Hans Dehmelt et al. tested the anomaly frequency, which plays a fundamental role in the measurement of the electron's gyromagnetic ratio. They searched for sidereal variations, and differences between electrons and positrons as well. Eventually they found no deviations, thereby establishing bounds of 10^{−24} GeV.
- Hughes et al. (2001) examined muons for sidereal signals in the spectrum of muons, and found no Lorentz violation down to 10^{−23} GeV.
- The "Muon g−2" collaboration of the Brookhaven National Laboratory searched for deviations in the anomaly frequency of muons and anti-muons, and for sidereal variations under consideration of Earth's orientation. Also here, no Lorentz violations could be found, with a precision of 10^{−24} GeV.

== Other particles and interactions ==
Third generation particles have been examined for potential Lorentz violations using SME. For instance, Altschul (2007) placed upper limits on Lorentz violation of the tau of 10^{−8}, by searching for anomalous absorption of high energy astrophysical radiation. In the BaBar experiment (2007), the D0 experiment (2015), and the LHCb experiment (2016), searches have been made for sidereal variations during Earth's rotation using B mesons (thus bottom quarks) and their antiparticles. No Lorentz and CPT violating signal were found with upper limits in the range 10^{−15} − 10^{−14} GeV. Also top quark pairs have been examined in the D0 experiment (2012). They showed that the cross section production of these pairs doesn't depend on sidereal time during Earth's rotation.

Lorentz violation bounds on Bhabha scattering have been given by Charneski et al. (2012). They showed that differential cross sections for the vector and axial couplings in QED become direction dependent in the presence of Lorentz violation. They found no indication of such an effect, placing upper limits on Lorentz violations of ≤ 10^{14} eV^{−1}.

== Gravitation ==
The influence of Lorentz violation on gravitational fields and thus general relativity was analyzed as well. The standard framework for such investigations is the Parameterized post-Newtonian formalism (PPN), in which Lorentz violating preferred frame effects are described by the parameters $\alpha_1, \alpha_2, \alpha_3$ (see the PPN article on observational bounds on these parameters). Lorentz violations are also discussed in relation to Alternatives to general relativity such as Loop quantum gravity, Emergent gravity, Einstein aether theory or Hořava–Lifshitz gravity.

Also SME is suitable to analyze Lorentz violations in the gravitational sector. Bailey and Kostelecky (2006) constrained Lorentz violations down to 10^{−9} by analyzing the perihelion shifts of Mercury and Earth, and down to 10^{−13} in relation to solar spin precession. Battat et al. (2007) examined Lunar Laser Ranging data and found no oscillatory perturbations in the lunar orbit. Their strongest SME bound excluding Lorentz violation was (6.9±4.5)×10^{−11}. Iorio (2012) obtained bounds at the 10^{−9} level by examining Keplerian orbital elements of a test particle acted upon by Lorentz-violating gravitomagnetic accelerations. Xie (2012) analyzed the advance of periastron of binary pulsars, setting limits on Lorentz violation at the 10^{−10} level.

== Neutrino tests ==
=== Neutrino oscillations ===
Although neutrino oscillations have been experimentally confirmed, the theoretical foundations are still controversial, as it can be seen in the discussion related to sterile neutrinos. This makes predictions of possible Lorentz violations very complicated. It is generally assumed that neutrino oscillations require a certain finite mass. However, oscillations could also occur as a consequence of Lorentz violations, so there are speculations as to how much those violations contribute to the mass of the neutrinos.

Additionally, a series of investigations have been published in which a sidereal dependence of the occurrence of neutrino oscillations was tested, which could arise when there were a preferred background field. This, possible CPT violations, and other coefficients of Lorentz violations in the framework of SME, have been tested. Here, some of the achieved GeV bounds for the validity of Lorentz invariance are stated:

Name	Year	SME bounds (GeV)
Double Chooz	2012	≤10^{−20}
MINOS	2012	≤10^{−23}
MiniBooNE	2012	≤10^{−20}
IceCube	2010	≤10^{−23}
MINOS	2010	≤10^{−23}
MINOS	2008	≤10^{−20}
LSND	2005	≤10^{−19}

=== Neutrino speed ===
Since the discovery of neutrino oscillations, it is assumed that their speed is slightly below the speed of light. Direct velocity measurements indicated an upper limit for relative speed differences between light and neutrinos of ${|v - c|}/{c} < 10^{-9}$, see measurements of neutrino speed.

Also indirect constraints on neutrino velocity, on the basis of effective field theories such as SME, can be achieved by searching for threshold effects such as Vacuum Cherenkov radiation. For example, neutrinos should exhibit Bremsstrahlung in the form of electron-positron pair production. Another possibility in the same framework is the investigation of the decay of pions into muons and neutrinos. Superluminal neutrinos would considerably delay those decay processes. The absence of those effects indicate tight limits for velocity differences between light and neutrinos.

Velocity differences between neutrino flavors can be constrained as well. A comparison between muon and electron neutrinos by Coleman & Glashow (1998) gave a negative result, with bounds < 6×10^{−22}.

Name	Year	Energy	SME bounds for (v − c)/c	
Name	Year	Energy	Vacuum Cherenkov	Pion decay
Stecker et al.	2014	1 PeV	< 5.6×10^{−19}	
Borriello et al.	2013	1 PeV	10^{−18}	
Cowsik et al.	2012	100 TeV	10^{−13}	
Huo et al.	2012	400 TeV	< 7.8×10^{−12}	
ICARUS	2011	17 GeV	< 2.5×10^{−8}	
Cowsik et al.	2011	400 TeV		10^{−12}
Bi et al.	2011	400 TeV		10^{−12}
Cohen/Glashow	2011	100 TeV	< 1.7×10^{−11}	

== Reports of alleged Lorentz violations ==
=== Open reports ===
LSND, MiniBooNE

In 2001, the LSND experiment observed a 3.8σ excess of antineutrino interactions in neutrino oscillations, which contradicts the Standard Model. First results of the more recent MiniBooNE experiment appeared to exclude this data above an energy scale of 450 MeV, but they had checked neutrino interactions, not antineutrino ones. In 2008, however, they reported an excess of electron-like neutrino events between 200 and 475 MeV. And in 2010, when carried out with antineutrinos (as in LSND), the result was in agreement with the LSND result, that is, an excess at the energy scale from 450 to 1250 MeV was observed. Whether those anomalies can be explained by sterile neutrinos, or whether they indicate Lorentz violations, is still discussed and subject to further theoretical and experimental researches.

=== Solved reports ===
In 2011 the OPERA Collaboration published (in a non-peer-reviewed arXiv preprint) the results of neutrino measurements, according to which neutrinos were traveling slightly faster than light. The neutrinos apparently arrived early by ~60 ns. The standard deviation was 6σ, clearly beyond the 5σ limit necessary for a significant result. However, in 2012 it was found that this result was due to measurement errors. The result was consistent with the speed of light; see Faster-than-light neutrino anomaly.

In 2010, MINOS reported differences between the disappearance (and thus the masses) of neutrinos and antineutrinos at the 2.3 sigma level. This would violate CPT symmetry and Lorentz symmetry. However, in 2011 MINOS updated their antineutrino results; after evaluating additional data, they reported that the difference is not as great as initially thought. In 2012, they published a paper in which they reported that the difference is now removed.

In 2007, the MAGIC Collaboration published a paper, in which they claimed a possible energy dependence of the speed of photons from the galaxy Markarian 501. They admitted, that also a possible energy-dependent emission effect could have cause this result as well. However, the MAGIC result was superseded by the substantially more precise measurements of the Fermi-LAT group, which couldn't find any effect even beyond the Planck energy. For details, see section Dispersion.

In 1997, Nodland & Ralston claimed to have found a rotation of the polarization plane of light coming from distant radio galaxies. This would indicate an anisotropy of space. This attracted some interest in the media. However, some criticisms immediately appeared, which disputed the interpretation of the data, and who alluded to errors in the publication. More recent studies have not found any evidence for this effect (see section on Birefringence).

== See also ==
- Tests of special relativity
- Phenomenological quantum gravity
