= Riccardo Barbieri =

Italian physicist (1944-)

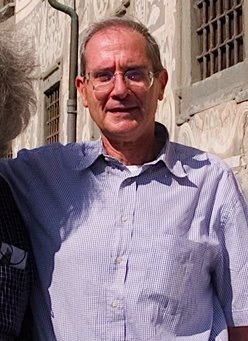
- Born: 1944 (age 81–82); Parma
- Known for: Physics beyond the Standard Model, Supersymmetry, Quantum field theory
- Scientific career
- Fields: Theoretical physicist
- Workplaces: Scuola Normale Superiore di Pisa

Riccardo Barbieri (born 1944) is an Italian theoretical physicist and a professor at the Scuola Normale Superiore di Pisa. He has written more than two hundred research papers in the field of theoretical elementary particle physics, and has been particularly influential in physics beyond the Standard Model.

== Research career ==
Riccardo Barbieri received his undergraduate education from 1963 to 1967 at the Scuola Normale Superiore in Pisa and at the University of Pisa. His laurea advisor was Pietro Menotti. During his professionalization classes (perfezionamento) from 1967 to 1969 at the Scuola Normale Superiore and in later years he worked on higher-order radiative corrections in Quantum Electrodynamics with Ettore Remiddi. In the 1970s, he turned to computations in Quantum Chromodynamics, collaborating in particular with Raoul Gatto and Zoltan Kunszt. In 1976 at CERN, he made the prediction, later experimentally verified, of the hadronic widths of the three charmonium P-waves.

From 1980 to 1982, Riccardo Barbieri was a staff member at the CERN Theory Division. The Standard Model of particle physics by then well established, he started focussing on models beyond the Standard Model, in particular supersymmetry. In 1982, he formulated the first realistic model of mediation of supersymmetry breaking via supergravity.

Since 1984 and until now, Riccardo Barbieri has been the professor of theoretical physics at Pisa, first at the University of Pisa (1984–97), and then at the Scuola Normale Superiore (1998–present). Some of his most influential results in this period include:

- In 1988, the quantitative formulation of the naturalness concept in supersymmetric models.
- In 1990, the formulation of a reference parametrization of the quantum corrections to the electroweak precision observables.
- In 1995, pointing out the significance of flavour and CP violations in supersymmetric unified theories even in the absence of any flavour or CP violation in the input for the soft-supersymmetry breaking parameters.
- In 2006, the proposal of a Dark Matter model based on a second Higgs doublet without vacuum expectation value.

== Mentoring ==
Having taught in Pisa for 30 years, Riccardo Barbieri is acclaimed for creating a school of theoretical high-energy physics. Among many of his students and postdocs who went on to become professors of theoretical physics in Italy and around the world, are Gian F. Giudice, and Michelangelo Mangano (permanent staff members at the CERN), Giovanni Ridolfi (professor at the University of Genoa), Riccardo Rattazzi (professor at the EPFL), Francesco Vissani (INFN director of research at Laboratori Nazionali del Gran Sasso), Alessandro Strumia (professor at the University of Pisa), Andrea Romanino (professor at SISSA), Roberto Contino (professor at the Sapienza University of Rome), Paolo Creminelli (professor at the ICTP), Michele Papucci (Divisional Fellow at Lawrence Berkeley National Laboratory), Gia Dvali (professor at the LMU Munich), Vyacheslav Rychkov (professor at the IHES), Stefania Gori (professor at UC Santa Cruz).

== Famous quotes ==
"Elementary particle physics is the quadrant of nature whose laws can be written in a few lines with absolute precision and the greatest empirical adequacy."

== Awards and honours ==
Prof. Barbieri was awarded the "Ordine del Cherubino" from the University of Pisa in 1997, the Humboldt Prize and, more recently, the Physics Prize of "Accademia Nazionale dei Lincei" in 2017. He was also a Miller Visiting Professor at the University of California, Berkeley.

== Books ==
- Barbieri, R. (2007). Lectures on the Electroweak Interactions, Publications of the Scuola Normale Superiore, Vol. 5
