= Phenomenology (physics) =

Application of theoretical physics to experimental data

In physics, phenomenology is the application of theoretical physics to experimental data by making quantitative predictions based upon known theories. It is related to the philosophical notion of phenomenology, in that these predictions describe anticipated behaviors for the phenomena in reality. Phenomenology stands in contrast with experimentation in the scientific method, whose goal is to test a scientific hypothesis instead of making predictions.

Phenomenology is commonly applied to the field of particle physics, where it forms a bridge between the mathematical models of theoretical physics (such as quantum field theories and theories of the structure of space-time) and the results of the high-energy particle experiments. It is sometimes used in other fields such as in condensed matter physics and plasma physics, when there are no existing theories for the observed experimental data.

== Applications in particle physics ==
=== Standard Model consequences ===
Within the well-tested and generally accepted Standard Model, phenomenology is the calculating of detailed predictions for experiments, usually at high precision (e.g., including radiative corrections).

Examples include:

- Next-to-leading order calculations of particle production rates and distributions.
- Monte Carlo simulation studies of physics processes at colliders.
- Extraction of parton distribution functions from data.

==== CKM matrix calculations ====
The CKM matrix is useful in these predictions:

- Application of heavy quark effective field theory to extract CKM matrix elements.
- Using lattice QCD to extract quark masses and CKM matrix elements from experiment.

=== Theoretical models ===
In Physics beyond the Standard Model, phenomenology addresses the experimental consequences of new models: how their new particles could be searched for, how the model parameters could be measured, and how the model could be distinguished from other, competing models.

==== Phenomenological analysis ====
Phenomenological analyses, in which one studies the experimental consequences of adding the most general set of beyond-the-Standard-Model effects in a given sector of the Standard Model, usually parameterized in terms of anomalous couplings and higher-dimensional operators. In this case, the term "phenomenological" is being used more in its philosophy of science sense.

== See also ==
- Effective theory
- Phenomenological model
- Phenomenological quantum gravity
