= Andrzej Buras =

Danish physicist

Andrzej Jerzy Buras
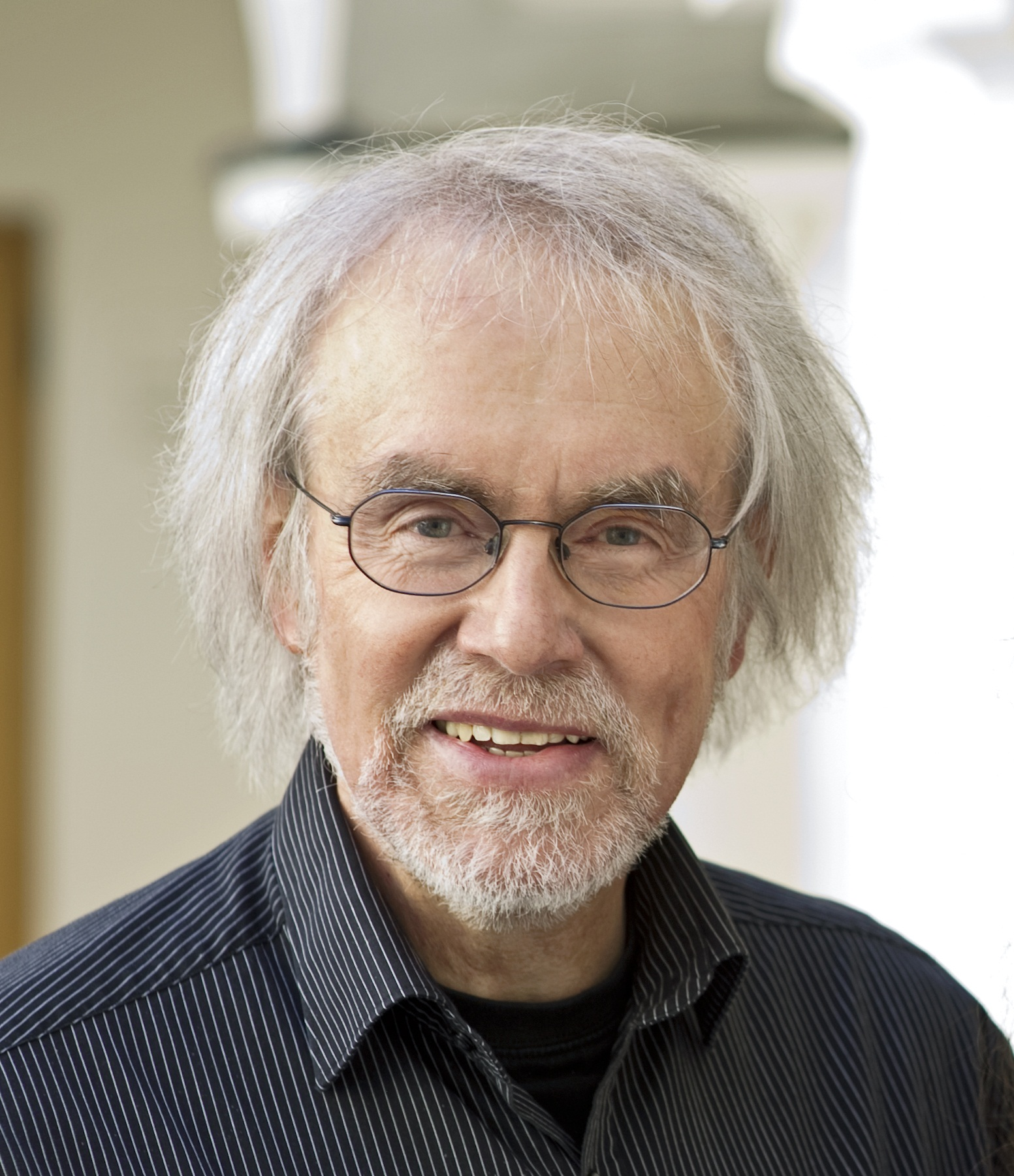
- Born: 26 October 1946 (age 79); Warsaw, Poland
- Education: University of Warsaw
- Awards: Sakurai Prize (2024); Max Planck Medal (2020); European Research Council Advanced Grant (2011–2016); Smoluchowski-Warburg Medal (2007)
- Scientific career
- Fields: Physics
- Institutions: Technical University of Munich
- Doctoral students: Stefania Gori

Andrzej Jerzy Buras (Polish pronunciation: [ˈandʐɛj ˈjɛʐɨˈburas]; born 26 October 1946 in Warsaw, Poland) is a Polish-born Danish theoretical physicist, professor emeritus at the Technical University of Munich (TUM).

== Scientific career ==
He received his master's degree in theoretical physics at the Warsaw University in 1971, and immigrated to Denmark in the same year. One year later, he received his PhD at the Niels Bohr Institute in Copenhagen. He then worked as a post-doctoral fellow at the Niels Bohr Institute until 1975.

After a fellowship in the CERN theory group from 1975 to 1977, he was first a visitor and then a staff member in the Fermilab theory group from 1977 till 1982. He then became staff member of the Max Planck Institute for Physics in Munich (1982–1988). In 1988, he was appointed full professor in the Physics Department of the TUM. After his retirement in 2012, he moved to the TUM Institute for Advanced Study where he is leading the focus group 'Fundamental Physics'.

Buras is known for his early work on strong-interaction effects (QCD) in deep-inelastic electron-proton and neutrino-proton scattering (1977–1980), which led to the commonly used MS-bar scheme for QCD calculations. But his most important contributions (1983-now) are in the field of weak decays of mesons; these include high order calculations of QCD effects in most important decays, the phenomenology of CP violation and of quark flavour physics in the Standard Model and in several New Physics models.

== Awards ==
- 2024: J. J. Sakurai Prize for Theoretical Particle Physics
- 2020: Max Planck Medal
- 2012: TUM Emeritus of Excellence
- 2010: European Research Council Advanced Grant (2011–2016)
- 2010: Erwin Schrödinger Visiting Professorship, University of Vienna
- 2008–2011: Carl von Linde Senior Fellowship at the TUM Institute for Advanced Study
- 2007: Smoluchowski-Warburg Medal of the German and Polish Physical Societies
- 2004: Distinguished Lecturer of the Alberta University
- Foreign member of the Polish Academy of Sciences (Warsaw, Poland)
- Foreign member of the Polish Academy of Arts and Sciences (Cracow, Poland)
- Ordinary Member of the Bavarian Academy of Sciences and Humanities (Munich)
