= Phenomenological quantum gravity =

Phenomenology of quantum gravity

Phenomenological quantum gravity is the research field that deals with the phenomenology of quantum gravity. The relevance of this research area derives from the fact that none of the candidate theories for quantum gravity has yielded experimentally testable predictions. Phenomenological models are designed to bridge this gap by allowing physicists to test for general properties that the hypothetical correct theory of quantum gravity has. Furthermore, due to this current lack of experiments, it is not known for sure that gravity is indeed quantum (i.e. that general relativity can be quantized), and so evidence is required to determine whether this is the case. Phenomenological models are also necessary to assess the promise of future quantum gravity experiments.

Direct experiments for quantum gravity (perhaps by detecting gravitons) would require reaching the Planck energy — on the order of 10^{28} eV, around 15 orders of magnitude higher than can be achieved with current particle accelerators — as well as needing a detector the size of a large planet. As a result, experimental investigation of quantum gravity was long thought to be impossible with current levels of technology.

However, in the early 21st century, new experiment designs and technologies have arisen which suggest that indirect approaches to testing quantum gravity may be feasible over the next few decades.

== See also ==
- Phenomenology (physics)
- Modern searches for Lorentz violation
- Quantum gravity
