= Sfermion =

Bosonic superpartner of a fermion

In supersymmetric extension to the Standard Model (SM) of physics, a sfermion is a hypothetical spin-0 superpartner particle (sparticle) of its associated fermion. Each particle has a superpartner with spin that differs by 1/2. Fermions in the SM have spin-1/2 and, therefore, sfermions have spin 0.

The name 'sfermion' was formed by the general rule of prefixing an 's' to the name of its superpartner, denoting that it is a scalar particle with spin 0. For instance, the electron's superpartner is the selectron and the top quark's superpartner is the stop squark.

One corollary from supersymmetry is that sparticles have the same gauge numbers as their SM partners. This means that sparticle–particle pairs have the same color charge, weak isospin charge, and hypercharge (and consequently electric charge). Unbroken supersymmetry also implies that sparticle–particle pairs have the same mass. This is evidently not the case, since these sparticles would have already been detected. Thus, sparticles must have different masses from the particle partners and supersymmetry is said to be broken.

== Fundamental sfermions ==
=== Squarks ===
Squarks (also quarkinos) are the superpartners of quarks. These include the sup squark, sdown squark, scharm squark, sstrange squark, stop squark, and sbottom squark.

Squarks
| Squark | Symbol | Associated quark | Symbol |
|---|---|---|---|
First generation
| Sup squark | $\tilde{u}$ | Up quark | $u$ |
| Sdown squark | $\tilde{d}$ | Down quark | $d$ |
Second generation
| Scharm squark | $\tilde{c}$ | Charm quark | $c$ |
| Sstrange squark | $\tilde{s}$ | Strange quark | $s$ |
Third generation
| Stop squark | $\tilde{t}$ | Top quark | $t$ |
| Sbottom squark | $\tilde{b}$ | Bottom quark | $b$ |

=== Sleptons ===
Sleptons are the superpartners of leptons. These include the selectron, smuon, stau, and their corresponding sneutrino flavors.

Sleptons
| Slepton | Symbol | Associated lepton | Symbol |
|---|---|---|---|
First generation
| Selectron | $\tilde{e}$ | Electron | $e$ |
| Selectron sneutrino | $\tilde{\nu}_e$ | Electron neutrino | $\nu_e$ |
Second generation
| Smuon | $\tilde{\mu}$ | Muon | $\mu$ |
| Smuon sneutrino | $\tilde{\nu}_\mu$ | Muon neutrino | $\nu_\mu$ |
Third generation
| Stau | $\tilde{\tau}$ | Tau | $\tau$ |
| Stau sneutrino | $\tilde{\nu}_\tau$ | Tau neutrino | $\nu_\tau$ |

== See also ==
- Minimal Supersymmetric Standard Model (MSSM)
