= Gian Francesco Giudice =

Italian theoretical physicist

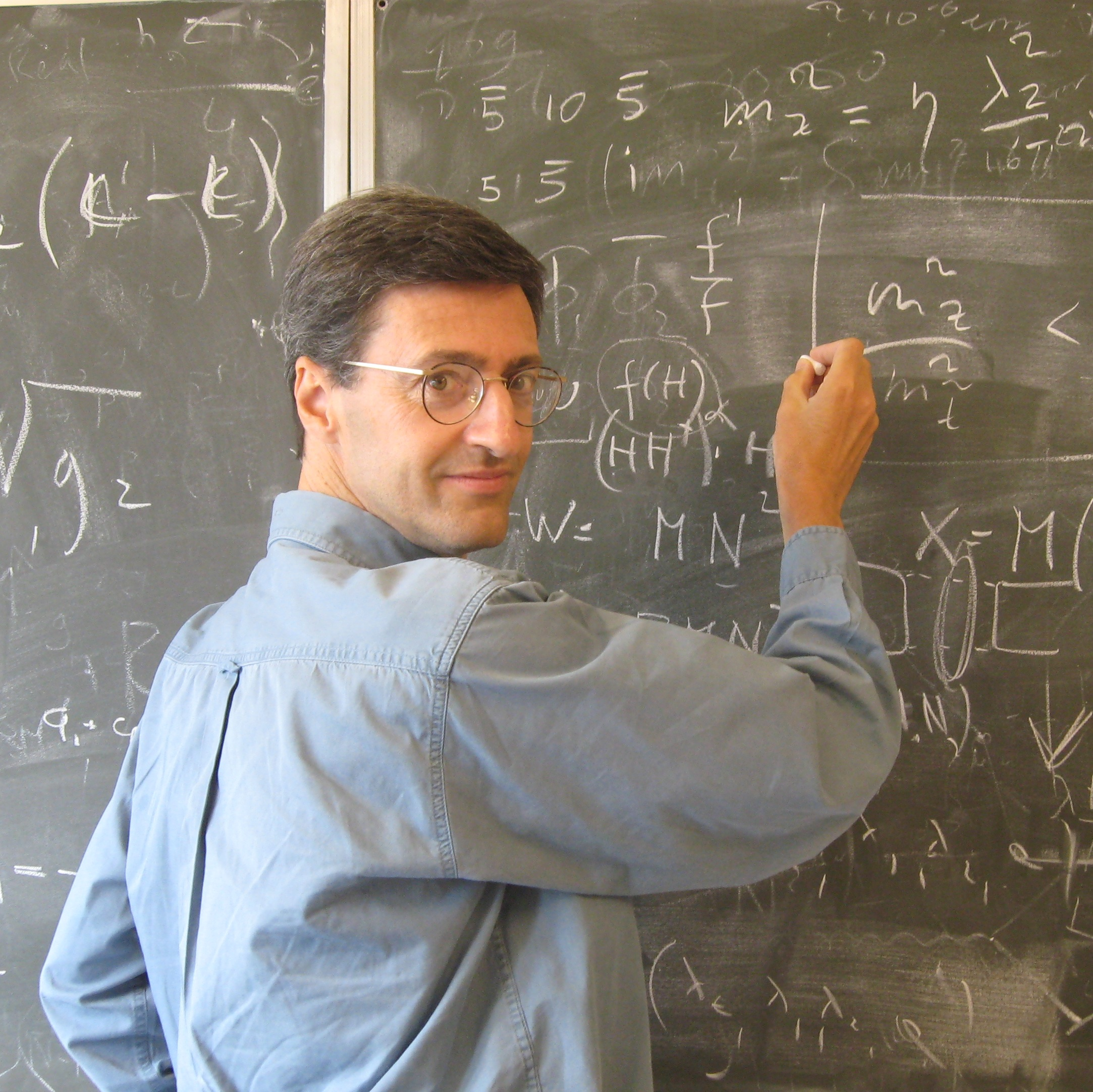
- Born: 25 January 1961 (age 65); Padua, Italy
- Education: University of Padua; International School for Advanced Studies
- Scientific career
- Fields: Physics
- Workplaces: New York University Abu Dhabi; CERN; INFN; University of Texas at Austin; Fermilab
- Doctoral advisor: Riccardo Barbieri

Gian Francesco Giudice (born 25 January 1961) is an Italian theoretical physicist specializing in particle physics and cosmology. He has spent most of his career at CERN, where he served as the Head of the Theoretical Physics Department for ten years. His research primarily focuses on developing new theories that expand our current understanding of the particle world and on exploring how these theories can describe the early stages of the universe's history.

== Academic career ==
After graduating in physics from the University of Padua in 1984, Giudice earned his PhD in theoretical physics from the International School for Advanced Studies in Trieste in 1988. He worked as a Research Associate at the Fermi National Accelerator Laboratory near Chicago from 1988 to 1990. He then became a Research Fellow in the Physics Department of the University of Texas at Austin, in the group led by Steven Weinberg. After being employed by the Istituto Nazionale di Fisica Nucleare of Italy, in 1993 he moved to CERN, where he served as the Head of the Theoretical Physics Department from 2016 to 2025. He has then become a Professor of Physics at New York University Abu Dhabi. Giudice has been elected academician of the Accademia dei Lincei, the Istituto Veneto di Scienze, Lettere ed Arti, Accademia Galileiana and the World Academy of Art and Science. His accolades include the Jacques Solvay Chair in Physics at the Université libre de Bruxelles (2013), Distinguished Visiting Research Chair at Perimeter Institute for Theoretical Physics (2019), Sackler Distinguished Lecturer at Tel Aviv University (2020), Chandrasekhar Lecturer at Tata Institute of Fundamental Research (2022) and Erwin-Schrödinger Professor at the University of Vienna (2023).

== Research ==
Giudice's research activity mainly deals with theories of fundamental forces that extend beyond the Standard Model, as well the role of supersymmetry and extra dimensions in the microscopic realm. He is also studying how these theories can be applied to cosmology in order to explain the early evolution of the universe. His most notable results are in the areas of supersymmetry, extra dimensions, electroweak physics, collider physics, dark matter, and leptogenesis. Together with physicist Riccardo Barbieri, he proposed a widely used criterion for evaluating the degree of naturalness of supersymmetric theories that achieve electroweak symmetry breaking. He co-invented the Giudice-Masiero mechanism, which is the leading explanation for the mu problem of supergravity. He has made fundamental contributions to the construction of Gauge Mediation, and he co-proposed Anomaly Mediation and Split Supersymmetry. He is one of the proponents of a method to compute quantum effects in theories with broken supersymmetry through analytic continuation into superspace. His approach to describing graviton interactions in theories with extra spatial dimensions is largely utilized for studies at the Large Hadron Collider. He is also one of the originators of the idea of Minimal Flavor Violation, a paradigm to characterize the effects of flavor transitions in new theories of particle physics. After the discovery of the Higgs boson, he computed the probability that the Higgs vacuum undergoes quantum tunneling, finding the surprising result that the universe is in a critical state, which will eventually end in a cosmic collapse.

== Support of particle accelerator projects ==
Giudice has been actively involved in studying the physics potential of particle accelerators, advocating and supporting several new projects at CERN and in other laboratories around the world. He has been a member of the LHC Experiments Committee (the body that reviews the activity of the experimental groups at the LHC), the European Committee for Future Accelerators (the advisory body for long-range planning of high-energy facilities in Europe), the preparatory group for the 2020 European Strategy for Particle Physics, and numerous advisory and review committees of research institutes worldwide.

== Science popularization ==
Besides his research work, Giudice is active in outreach efforts. He frequently gives public lectures on particle physics and related topics, and participates in science festivals and other events. He is the author of A Zeptospace Odyssey, a popular science book on the physics of the LHC, which has been finalist for the 2012 Galileo Literary Prize and the Prize Pianeta Galileo 2013. Originally written in English, the book has been translated into Italian, German, French, Spanish, and Korean. Giudice is also the author of Before the Big Bang, a popular science book that explores the origin of the universe. The book has been translated into six languages and has been finalist for the Science Book of the Year Trieste Next 2024, Cosmos Prize 2024 and Premio Nazionale di Divulgazione Scientifica 2024 - Giancarlo Dosi.
