= Ultraviolet fixed point =

Field theory fixed point at high energies

In a quantum field theory, one may calculate an effective or running coupling constant that defines the coupling of the theory measured at a given momentum scale. One example of such a coupling constant is the electric charge.

In approximate calculations in several quantum field theories, notably quantum electrodynamics and theories of the Higgs particle, the running coupling appears to become infinite at a finite momentum scale. This is sometimes called the Landau pole problem.

It is not known whether the appearance of these inconsistencies is an artifact of the approximation, or a real fundamental problem in the theory. However, the problem can be avoided if an ultraviolet or UV fixed point appears in the theory. A quantum field theory has a UV fixed point if its renormalization group flow approaches a fixed point in the ultraviolet (i.e. short length scale/large energy) limit. This is related to zeroes of the beta-function appearing in the Callan–Symanzik equation. The large length scale/small energy limit counterpart is the infrared fixed point.

== Specific cases and details ==
Among other things, it means that a theory possessing a UV fixed point may not be an effective field theory, because it is well-defined at arbitrarily small distance scales. At the UV fixed point itself, the theory can behave as a conformal field theory.

The converse statement, that any QFT which is valid at all distance scales (i.e. isn't an effective field theory) has a UV fixed point is false. See, for example, cascading gauge theory.

Noncommutative quantum field theories have a UV cutoff even though they are not effective field theories.

Physicists distinguish between trivial and nontrivial fixed points. If a UV fixed point is trivial (generally known as Gaussian fixed point), the theory is said to be asymptotically free. On the other hand, a scenario, where a non-Gaussian (i.e. nontrivial) fixed point is approached in the UV limit, is referred to as asymptotic safety. Asymptotically safe theories may be well defined at all scales despite being nonrenormalizable in perturbative sense (according to the classical scaling dimensions).

== Asymptotic safety scenario in quantum gravity ==
Steven Weinberg has proposed that the problematic UV divergences appearing in quantum theories of gravity may be cured by means of a nontrivial UV fixed point. Such an asymptotically safe theory is renormalizable in a nonperturbative sense, and due to the fixed point physical quantities are free from divergences. As yet, a general proof for the existence of the fixed point is still lacking, but there is mounting evidence for this scenario.

== See also ==
- Asymptotic freedom
- Asymptotic safety in quantum gravity
- Landau pole
- Quantum triviality
- Ultraviolet divergence
