= Ultraviolet completion =

Extension of a quantum theory to another theory valid at higher energies

In theoretical physics, ultraviolet completion, or UV completion, of a quantum field theory is the passing from a lower energy quantum field theory to a more general quantum field theory above a threshold value known as the cutoff. In particular, the more general high energy theory must be well-defined at arbitrarily high energies.

The word "ultraviolet" in this so-called "ultraviolet regime" is only figurative, and refers to energies much higher than ultraviolet light per se. Rather, by analogy to the relationship between ultraviolet and visible light, it refers to energies higher than (and wavelengths shorter than) those "visible" to laboratory experiment.

The ultraviolet theory must be renormalizable; it can have no Landau poles; and most typically, it enjoys asymptotic freedom in the case that it is a quantum field theory (or at least has a nontrivial fixed point). However, it may also be a background of string theory whose ultraviolet behavior is at least as good as that of renormalizable quantum field theories. Besides these two known examples (QFT and string theory), it could be a completely different theory than string theory that behaves well at very high energies.

There is an analogous phrase "infrared completion", which applies to length scales longer than those "visible" to normal experiment, particularly cosmology distances.

== See also ==
- Ultraviolet divergence
- Fermi's interaction
- Quantum mechanics
- String theory
