= Physics applications of asymptotically safe gravity =

Nonpertubative field theoretic approach to quantum gravity

The asymptotic safety approach to quantum gravity provides a nonperturbative notion of renormalization in order to find a consistent and predictive quantum field theory of the gravitational interaction and spacetime geometry. It is based upon a nontrivial fixed point of the corresponding renormalization group (RG) flow such that the running coupling constants approach this fixed point in the ultraviolet (UV) limit. This suffices to avoid divergences in physical observables. Moreover, it has predictive power: Generically an arbitrary starting configuration of coupling constants given at some RG scale does not run into the fixed point for increasing scale, but a subset of configurations might have the desired UV properties. For this reason it is possible that — assuming a particular set of couplings has been measured in an experiment — the requirement of asymptotic safety fixes all remaining couplings in such a way that the UV fixed point is approached.

Asymptotic safety, if realized in Nature, has far reaching consequences in all areas where quantum effects of gravity are to be expected. Their exploration, however, is still in its infancy. By now there are some phenomenological studies concerning the implications of asymptotic safety in particle physics, astrophysics and cosmology, for instance.

== Standard Model ==
=== Mass of the Higgs boson ===
The Standard Model in combination with asymptotic safety might be valid up to arbitrarily high energies. Based on the assumption that this is indeed correct it is possible to make a statement about the Higgs boson mass. The first concrete results were obtained by Mikhail Shaposhnikov and Christof Wetterich in 2010. Depending on the sign of the gravity induced anomalous dimension $A_\lambda$ there are two possibilities: For $A_\lambda<0$ the Higgs mass $m_\text{H}$ is restricted to the window $126\,\text{GeV} < m_\text{H} < 174\,\text{GeV}$. If, on the other hand, $A_\lambda>0$ which is the favored possibility, $m_\text{H}$ must take the value

$$m_\text{H}=126\,\text{GeV} ,$$

with an uncertainty of a few GeV only. In this spirit one can consider $m_\text{H}$ a prediction of asymptotic safety. The result is in surprisingly good agreement with the latest experimental data measured at CERN in 2013 by the ATLAS and CMS collaborations, where a value of $m_\text{H}=125.10\ \pm 0.14\,\text{GeV}$ has been determined.

=== Fine structure constant ===
By taking into account the gravitational correction to the running of the fine structure constant $\alpha$ of quantum electrodynamics, Ulrich Harst and Martin Reuter were able to study the impacts of asymptotic safety on the infrared (renormalized) value of $\alpha$. They found two fixed points suitable for the asymptotic safety construction both of which imply a well-behaved UV limit, without running into a Landau pole type singularity. The first one is characterized by a vanishing $\alpha$, and the infrared value $\alpha_\text{IR}$ is a free parameter. In the second case, however, the fixed point value of $\alpha$ is non-zero, and its infrared value is a computable prediction of the theory.

In a more recent study, Nicolai Christiansen and Astrid Eichhorn showed that quantum fluctuations of gravity generically generate self-interactions for gauge theories, which have to be included in a discussion of a potential ultraviolet completion. Depending on the gravitational and gauge parameters, they conclude that the fine structure constant $\alpha$ might be asymptotically free and not run into a Landau pole, while the induced coupling for the gauge self-interaction is irrelevant and thus its value can be predicted. This is an explicit example where Asymptotic Safety solves a problem of the Standard Model - the triviality of the U(1) sector - without introducing new free parameters.

== Astrophysics and cosmology ==
Phenomenological consequences of asymptotic safety can be expected also for astrophysics and cosmology. Alfio Bonanno and Reuter investigated the horizon structure of "renormalization group improved" black holes and computed quantum gravity corrections to the Hawking temperature and the corresponding thermodynamical entropy. By means of an RG improvement of the Einstein–Hilbert action, Reuter and Holger Weyer obtained a modified version of the Einstein equations which in turn results in a modification of the Newtonian limit, providing a possible explanation for the observed flat galaxy rotation curves without having to postulate the presence of dark matter.

As for cosmology, Bonanno and Reuter argued that asymptotic safety modifies the very early Universe, possibly leading to a resolution to the horizon and flatness problem of standard cosmology. Furthermore, asymptotic safety provides the possibility of inflation without the need of an inflaton field (while driven by the cosmological constant). It was reasoned that the scale invariance related to the non-Gaussian fixed point underlying asymptotic safety is responsible for the near scale invariance of the primordial density perturbations. Using different methods, asymptotically safe inflation was analyzed further by Weinberg.

== See also ==
- Asymptotic safety in quantum gravity
- Quantum gravity
- UV fixed point
