= Renormalization group equation =

Renormalization group equation may refer to:

- Beta function (physics)
- Callan–Symanzik equation
- Exact renormalization group equation
