= Iosif Khriplovich =

Russian physicist (1937–2024)

Iosif Benzionovich Khriplovich (Russian: Иосиф Бенционович Хриплович; 23 January 1937 – 26 September 2024) was a Russian theoretical physicist who made profound contributions to quantum field theory, atomic physics, and general relativity.

== Biography ==
Khriplovich was a Chief Researcher at the Budker Institute of Nuclear Physics, Novosibirsk, and held a Chair of Theoretical Physics at Novosibirsk State University. Dr. Khriplovich was elected to the Russian Academy of Sciences in 2000, and remained a Corresponding Member. He was awarded the 2004 Silver Dirac Medal for the Advancement of Theoretical Physics by University of New South Wales, Sydney, Australia, and shared the 2005 Pomeranchuk Prize with Arkady Vainshtein For outstanding contribution to the understanding the properties of the standard model, especially for illuminating work on weak and strong interactions of quarks, a prize awarded by the Institute of Theoretical and Experimental Physics of Moscow.

Khriplovich was the first to correctly calculate the beta function for the coupling renormalization in a non-Abelian Yang–Mills theory, although at that time (1969) asymptotic freedom was not yet recognized as a property of the strong interactions.

Starting in the early-1970s he was one of the initiators of the search for parity violating effects in atoms, and he pioneered a great number of detailed calculations of the effect in various atoms, including the effect of the rotation of polarization of light in bismuth, which was the first parity violating atomic effect which was experimentally observed.

Khriplovich died on 26 September 2024, at the age of 87.

== Books ==
- "Parity Nonconservation in Atomic Phenomena" (1991)
- "CP Violation without Strangeness. Electric Dipole Moments of Particles, Atoms, and Molecules" (1997), with S.K.Lamoreaux
- "General Relativity" (2002)

== See also ==
- Akademgorodok
