= Dimensional transmutation =

Physical mechanism creating dimensionful parameters

In particle physics, dimensional transmutation is a physical mechanism providing a linkage between a dimensionless parameter and a dimensionful parameter.

In classical field theory, such as gauge theory in four-dimensional spacetime, the coupling constant is a dimensionless constant. However, upon quantization, logarithmic divergences in one-loop diagrams of perturbation theory imply that this "constant" actually depends on the typical energy scale of the processes under considerations, called the renormalization group (RG) scale. This "running" of the coupling is specified by the beta function of the renormalization group.

Consequently, the interaction may be characterised by a dimensionful parameter Λ, namely the value of the RG scale at which the coupling constant diverges. In the case of quantum chromodynamics, this energy scale Λ is called the QCD scale, and its value 220 MeV supplants the role of the original dimensionless coupling constant in the form of the logarithm (at one-loop) of the ratio μ and Λ. Perturbation theory, which produced this type of running formula, is only valid for a (dimensionless) coupling g ≪ 1. In the case of QCD, the energy scale Λ is an infrared cutoff, such that μ ≫ Λ implies g ≪ 1, with μ the RG scale.

On the other hand, in the case of theories such as QED, Λ is an ultraviolet cutoff, such that μ ≪ Λ implies g ≪ 1.

This is also a way of saying that the conformal symmetry of the classical theory is anomalously broken upon quantization, thereby setting up a mass scale. See conformal anomaly.
