= Scalar field theory =

Field theory of scalar fields

In theoretical physics, scalar field theory can refer to a relativistically invariant classical or quantum theory of scalar fields. A scalar field is invariant under any Lorentz transformation.

The only fundamental scalar quantum field that has been observed in nature is the Higgs field. However, scalar quantum fields feature in the effective field theory descriptions of many physical phenomena. An example is the pion, which is actually a pseudoscalar.

Since they do not involve polarization complications, scalar fields are often the easiest to appreciate second quantization through. For this reason, scalar field theories are often used for purposes of introduction of novel concepts and techniques.

The signature of the metric employed below is (+ − − −).

== Classical scalar field theory ==
=== Linear (free) theory ===
The most basic scalar field theory is the linear theory. Through the Fourier decomposition of the fields, it represents the normal modes of an infinity of coupled oscillators where the continuum limit of the oscillator index i is now denoted by x. The action for the free relativistic scalar field theory is then

$$\begin{align}
\mathcal{S} &= \int \mathrm{d}^{D-1}x \mathrm{d}t \mathcal{L} \\
&= \int \mathrm{d}^{D-1}x \mathrm{d}t \left[\frac{1}{2}\eta^{\mu\nu}\partial_\mu\phi\partial_\nu\phi - \frac{1}{2} m^2\phi^2\right] \\[6pt]
&= \int \mathrm{d}^{D-1}x \mathrm{d}t \left[\frac{1}{2}(\partial_t\phi)^2 - \frac{1}{2}\delta^{ij}\partial_i\phi \partial_j\phi -\frac{1}{2} m^2\phi^2\right],
\end{align}$$

where $\mathcal{L}$ is known as a Lagrangian density; d^{4−1}x ≡ dx ⋅ dy ⋅ dz ≡ dx^{1} ⋅ dx^{2} ⋅ dx^{3} for the three spatial coordinates; δ^{ij} is the Kronecker delta function; and ∂_{ρ} = ∂/∂x^{ρ} for the ρ-th coordinate x^{ρ}.

This is an example of a quadratic action, since each of the terms is quadratic in the field, φ. The term proportional to m^{2} is sometimes known as a mass term, due to its subsequent interpretation, in the quantized version of this theory, in terms of particle mass.

The equation of motion for this theory is obtained by extremizing the action above. It takes the following form, linear in φ,

$$\eta^{\mu\nu}\partial_\mu\partial_\nu\phi+m^2\phi=\partial^2_t\phi-\nabla^2\phi+m^2\phi=0 ~,$$

where ∇^{2} is the Laplace operator. This is the Klein–Gordon equation, with the interpretation as a classical field equation, rather than as a quantum-mechanical wave equation.

=== Nonlinear (interacting) theory ===
The most common generalization of the linear theory above is to add a scalar potential $V(\phi)$ to the Lagrangian, where typically, in addition to a mass term $m^2 \phi^2 / 2$, the potential $V$ has higher order polynomial terms in $\phi$. Such a theory is sometimes said to be interacting, because the Euler–Lagrange equation is now nonlinear, implying a self-interaction. The action for the most general such theory is

$$\begin{align}
\mathcal{S} &= \int \mathrm{d}^{D-1}x \, \mathrm{d}t \mathcal{L} \\[3pt]
&= \int \mathrm{d}^{D-1}x \mathrm{d}t \left[\frac{1}{2}\eta^{\mu\nu}\partial_\mu\phi\partial_\nu\phi - V(\phi) \right] \\[3pt]
&= \int \mathrm{d}^{D-1}x \, \mathrm{d}t \left[
\frac{1}{2}(\partial_t\phi)^2 - \frac{1}{2}\delta^{ij}\partial_i\phi\partial_j\phi -
\frac{1}{2}m^2\phi^2 - \sum_{n=3}^\infty \frac{1}{n!} g_n\phi^n
\right]
\end{align}$$

The $n !$ factors in the expansion are introduced because they are useful in the Feynman diagram expansion of the quantum theory, as described below.

The corresponding Euler–Lagrange equation of motion is now

$$\eta^{\mu\nu} \partial_\mu \partial_\nu\phi + V'(\phi) = \partial^2_t \phi - \nabla^2 \phi + V'(\phi) = 0.$$

=== Dimensional analysis and scaling ===
Physical quantities in these scalar field theories may have dimensions of length, time or mass, or some combination of the three. However, in a relativistic theory, any quantity t, with dimensions of time, can be readily converted into a length, l =ct, by using the velocity of light, c. Similarly, any length l is equivalent to an inverse mass, ħ=lmc, using the Planck constant, ħ. In natural units, one thinks of a time as a length, or either time or length as an inverse mass.

In short, one can think of the dimensions of any physical quantity as defined in terms of just one independent dimension, rather than in terms of all three. This is most often termed the mass dimension of the quantity. Knowing the dimensions of each quantity, allows one to uniquely restore conventional dimensions from a natural units expression in terms of this mass dimension, by simply reinserting the requisite powers of ħ and c required for dimensional consistency.

One conceivable objection is that this theory is classical, and therefore it is not obvious how the Planck constant should be a part of the theory at all. If desired, one could indeed recast the theory without mass dimensions at all: However, this would be at the expense of slightly obscuring the connection with the quantum scalar field. Given that one has dimensions of mass, the Planck constant is thought of here as an essentially arbitrary fixed reference quantity of action (not necessarily connected to quantization), hence with dimensions appropriate to convert between mass and inverse length.

==== Scaling dimension ====
The classical scaling dimension, or mass dimension, Δ, of φ describes the transformation of the field under a rescaling of coordinates:

$$x\rightarrow\lambda x$$
$$\phi\rightarrow\lambda^{-\Delta}\phi ~.$$

The units of action are the same as the units of ħ, and so the action itself has zero mass dimension. This fixes the scaling dimension of the field φ to be

$$\Delta =\frac{D-2}{2}.$$

==== Scale invariance ====
There is a specific sense in which some scalar field theories are scale-invariant. While the actions above are all constructed to have zero mass dimension, not all actions are invariant under the scaling transformation

$$x\rightarrow\lambda x$$
$$\phi\rightarrow\lambda^{-\Delta}\phi ~.$$

The reason that not all actions are invariant is that one usually thinks of the parameters m and g_{n} as fixed quantities, which are not rescaled under the transformation above. The condition for a scalar field theory to be scale invariant is then quite obvious: all of the parameters appearing in the action should be dimensionless quantities. In other words, a scale invariant theory is one without any fixed length scale (or equivalently, mass scale) in the theory.

For a scalar field theory with D spacetime dimensions, the only dimensionless parameter g_{n} satisfies n = 2D/((D − 2)) . For example, in D = 4, only g_{4} is classically dimensionless, and so the only classically scale-invariant scalar field theory in D = 4 is the massless φ^{4} theory.

Classical scale invariance, however, normally does not imply quantum scale invariance, because of the renormalization group involved – see the discussion of the beta function below.

==== Conformal invariance ====
A transformation

$$x\rightarrow \tilde{x}(x)$$

is said to be conformal if the transformation satisfies

$$\frac{\partial\tilde{x^\mu}}{\partial x^\rho}\frac{\partial\tilde{x^\nu}}{\partial
x^\sigma}\eta_{\mu\nu}=\lambda^2(x)\eta_{\rho\sigma}$$

for some function λ(x).

The conformal group contains as subgroups the isometries of the metric $\eta_{\mu\nu}$ (the Poincaré group) and also the scaling transformations (or dilatations) considered above. In fact, the scale-invariant theories in the previous section are also conformally-invariant.

=== φ^{4} theory ===
Massive φ^{4} theory illustrates a number of interesting phenomena in scalar field theory.

The Lagrangian density is

$$\mathcal{L}=\frac{1}{2}(\partial_t\phi)^2 -\frac{1}{2}\delta^{ij}\partial_i\phi\partial_j\phi - \frac{1}{2}m^2\phi^2-\frac{g}{4!}\phi^4.$$

==== Spontaneous symmetry breaking ====
This Lagrangian has a $\mathbb{Z}_2$ symmetry under the transformation φ→ −φ. This is an example of an internal symmetry, in contrast to a space-time symmetry.

If m^{2} is positive, the potential

$$V(\phi)=\frac{1}{2}m^2\phi^2 +\frac{g}{4!}\phi^4$$

has a single minimum, at the origin. The solution φ=0 is clearly invariant under the $\mathbb{Z}_2$ symmetry.

Conversely, if m^{2} is negative, then one can readily see that the potential

$$V(\phi)=\frac{1}{2}m^2\phi^2+\frac{g}{4!}\phi^4$$

has two minima. This is known as a double well potential, and the lowest energy states (known as the vacua, in quantum field theoretical language) in such a theory are not invariant under the $\mathbb{Z}_2$ symmetry of the action (in fact it maps each of the two vacua into the other). In this case, the $\mathbb{Z}_2$ symmetry is said to be spontaneously broken.

==== Kink solutions ====
The φ^{4} theory with a negative m^{2} also has a kink solution, which is a canonical example of a soliton. Such a solution is of the form

$$\phi(\vec{x}, t) = \pm\frac{m}{2\sqrt{\frac{g}{4!}}}\tanh\left[\frac{m(x - x_0)}{\sqrt{2}}\right]$$

where x is one of the spatial variables (φ is taken to be independent of t, and the remaining spatial variables). The solution interpolates between the two different vacua of the double well potential. It is not possible to deform the kink into a constant solution without passing through a solution of infinite energy, and for this reason the kink is said to be stable. For D>2 (i.e., theories with more than one spatial dimension), this solution is called a domain wall.

Another well-known example of a scalar field theory with kink solutions is the sine-Gordon theory.

=== Complex scalar field theory ===
In a complex scalar field theory, the scalar field takes values in the complex numbers, rather than the real numbers. The complex scalar field represents spin-0 particles and antiparticles with charge. The action considered normally takes the form

$$\mathcal{S}=\int \mathrm{d}^{D-1}x \, \mathrm{d}t
\mathcal{L} = \int \mathrm{d}^{D-1}x \, \mathrm{d}t \left[\eta^{\mu\nu}\partial_\mu\phi^*\partial_\nu\phi
-V(|\phi|^2)\right]$$

This has a U(1), equivalently O(2) symmetry, whose action on the space of fields rotates $\phi\rightarrow e^{i\alpha}\phi$, for some real phase angle α.

As for the real scalar field, spontaneous symmetry breaking is found if m^{2} is negative. This gives rise to Goldstone's Mexican hat potential which is a rotation of the double-well potential of a real scalar field through 2π radians about the V$(\phi)$ axis. The symmetry breaking takes place in one higher dimension, i.e., the choice of vacuum breaks a continuous U(1) symmetry instead of a discrete one. The two components of the scalar field are reconfigured as a massive mode and a massless Goldstone boson.

=== O(N) theory ===
One can express the complex scalar field theory in terms of two real fields, φ^{1} = Re φ and φ^{2} = Im φ, which transform in the vector representation of the U(1) = O(2) internal symmetry. Although such fields transform as a vector under the internal symmetry, they are still Lorentz scalars.

This can be generalised to a theory of N scalar fields transforming in the vector representation of the O(N) symmetry. The Lagrangian for an O(N)-invariant scalar field theory is typically of the form

$$\mathcal{L}=\frac{1}{2}\eta^{\mu\nu}\partial_\mu\phi\cdot\partial_\nu\phi -V(\phi\cdot\phi)$$

using an appropriate O(N)-invariant inner product. The theory can also be expressed for complex vector fields, i.e. for $\phi\in\Complex^n$, in which case the symmetry group is the Lie group SU(N).

=== Gauge-field couplings ===
When the scalar field theory is coupled in a gauge invariant way to the Yang–Mills action, one obtains the Ginzburg–Landau theory of superconductors. The topological solitons of that theory correspond to vortices in a superconductor; the minimum of the Mexican hat potential corresponds to the order parameter of the superconductor.

== Quantum scalar field theory ==
In quantum field theory, the fields, and all observables constructed from them, are replaced by quantum operators on a Hilbert space. This Hilbert space is built on a vacuum state, and dynamics are governed by a quantum Hamiltonian, a positive-definite operator which annihilates the vacuum. A construction of a quantum scalar field theory is detailed in the canonical quantization article, which relies on canonical commutation relations among the fields. Essentially, the infinity of classical oscillators repackaged in the scalar field as its (decoupled) normal modes, above, are now quantized in the standard manner, so the respective quantum operator field describes an infinity of quantum harmonic oscillators acting on a respective Fock space.

In brief, the basic variables are the quantum field φ and its canonical momentum π. Both these operator-valued fields are Hermitian. At spatial points x→, y→ and at equal times, their canonical commutation relations are given by

$$\begin{align}
\left[\phi\left(\vec{x}\right), \phi\left(\vec{y}\right)\right] =
\left[\pi\left(\vec{x}\right), \pi\left(\vec{y}\right)\right] &= 0,\\
\left[\phi\left(\vec{x}\right), \pi\left(\vec{y}\right)\right] &= i \delta\left(\vec{x} - \vec{y}\right),
\end{align}$$

while the free Hamiltonian is, similarly to above,

$$H = \int d^3x \left[{1 \over 2}\pi^2 + {1 \over 2}(\nabla \phi)^2 + {m^2 \over 2}\phi^2\right].$$

A spatial Fourier transform leads to momentum space fields

$$\begin{align}
\widetilde{\phi}(\vec{k}) &= \int d^3x e^{-i\vec{k}\cdot\vec{x}}\phi(\vec{x}),\\
\widetilde{\pi}(\vec{k}) &= \int d^3x e^{-i\vec{k}\cdot\vec{x}}\pi(\vec{x})
\end{align}$$

which resolve to annihilation and creation operators

$$\begin{align}
a(\vec{k}) &= \left(E\widetilde{\phi}(\vec{k}) + i\widetilde{\pi}(\vec{k})\right),\\
a^\dagger(\vec{k}) &= \left(E\widetilde{\phi}^\dagger(\vec{k}) - i\widetilde{\pi}^\dagger(\vec{k})\right),
\end{align}$$

where $E = \sqrt{k^2 + m^2}$.

These operators satisfy the commutation relations

$$\begin{align}
\left[a(\vec{k}_1), a(\vec{k}_2)\right] =
\left[a^\dagger(\vec{k}_1), a^\dagger(\vec{k}_2)\right] &= 0,\\
\left[a(\vec{k}_1), a^\dagger(\vec{k}_2)\right] &= (2\pi)^3 2E \delta(\vec{k}_1 - \vec{k}_2).
\end{align}$$

The state $| 0\rangle$ annihilated by all of the operators a is identified as the bare vacuum, and a particle with momentum k→ is created by applying $a^\dagger(\vec{k})$ to the vacuum.

Applying all possible combinations of creation operators to the vacuum constructs the relevant Hilbert space: This construction is called Fock space. The vacuum is annihilated by the Hamiltonian

$$H = \int {d^3k\over (2\pi)^3}\frac{1}{2} a^\dagger(\vec{k}) a(\vec{k}) ,$$

where the zero-point energy has been removed by Wick ordering. (See canonical quantization.)

Interactions can be included by adding an interaction Hamiltonian. For a φ^{4} theory, this corresponds to adding a Wick ordered term g:φ^{4}:/4! to the Hamiltonian, and integrating over x. Scattering amplitudes may be calculated from this Hamiltonian in the interaction picture. These are constructed in perturbation theory by means of the Dyson series, which gives the time-ordered products, or n-particle Green's functions $\langle 0|\mathcal{T}\{\phi(x_1) \cdots \phi(x_n)\}|0\rangle$ as described in the Dyson series article. The Green's functions may also be obtained from a generating function that is constructed as a solution to the Schwinger–Dyson equation.

=== Feynman path integral ===
The Feynman diagram expansion may be obtained also from the Feynman path integral formulation. The time ordered vacuum expectation values of polynomials in φ, known as the n-particle Green's functions, are constructed by integrating over all possible fields, normalized by the vacuum expectation value with no external fields,

$$\langle 0|\mathcal{T}\{\phi(x_1)\cdots \phi(x_n)\}|0\rangle =
\frac
{\int \mathcal{D}\phi \phi(x_1) \cdots \phi(x_n) e^{i\int d^4x \left({1 \over 2}\partial^\mu \phi \partial_\mu \phi - {m^2 \over 2}\phi^2 - {g \over 4!}\phi^4\right)}}
{\int \mathcal{D}\phi e^{i\int d^4x \left({1 \over 2}\partial^\mu \phi \partial_\mu \phi - {m^2 \over 2}\phi^2 - {g \over 4!}\phi^4\right)}}.$$

All of these Green's functions may be obtained by expanding the exponential in J(x)φ(x) in the generating function

$$Z[J] =
\int \mathcal{D}\phi e^{i\int d^4x \left({1 \over 2}\partial^\mu \phi \partial_\mu \phi - {m^2 \over 2}\phi^2 - {g \over 4!}\phi^4 + J\phi\right)} =
Z[0] \sum_{n=0}^{\infty} \frac{i^n}{n!} J(x_1) \cdots J(x_n) \langle 0|\mathcal{T}\{\phi(x_1) \cdots \phi(x_n)\}|0\rangle.$$

A Wick rotation may be applied to make time imaginary. Changing the signature to (++++) then turns the Feynman integral into a statistical mechanics partition function in Euclidean space,

$$Z[J] = \int \mathcal{D}\phi e^{-\int d^4x \left[{1 \over 2}(\nabla\phi)^2 + {m^2 \over 2}\phi^2 + {g \over 4!}\phi^4 + J\phi\right]}.$$

Normally, this is applied to the scattering of particles with fixed momenta, in which case, a Fourier transform is useful, giving instead

$$\tilde{Z}[\tilde{J}]=\int \mathcal{D}\tilde\phi e^{-\int {d^4p \over (2\pi)^4} \left({1\over 2}(p^2+m^2)\tilde\phi^2-\tilde{J}\tilde\phi+{g \over 4!}{\int {d^4p_1 \over (2\pi)^4}{d^4p_2 \over (2\pi)^4}{d^4p_3 \over (2\pi)^4}\delta(p-p_1-p_2-p_3)\tilde\phi(p)\tilde\phi(p_1)\tilde\phi(p_2)\tilde\phi(p_3)}\right)}.$$

where $\delta(x)$ is the Dirac delta function.

The standard trick to evaluate this functional integral is to write it as a product of exponential factors, schematically,

$$\tilde{Z}[\tilde{J}]=\int \mathcal{D}\tilde\phi \prod_p \left[e^{-(p^2+m^2)\tilde\phi^2/2} e^{-g/4!\int {d^4p_1 \over (2\pi)^4}{d^4p_2 \over (2\pi)^4}{d^4p_3 \over (2\pi)^4}\delta(p-p_1-p_2-p_3)\tilde\phi(p)\tilde\phi(p_1)\tilde\phi(p_2)\tilde\phi(p_3)} e^{\tilde{J}\tilde\phi}\right].$$

The second two exponential factors can be expanded as power series, and the combinatorics of this expansion can be represented graphically through Feynman diagrams of the Quartic interaction.

The integral with g = 0 can be treated as a product of infinitely many elementary Gaussian integrals: the result may be expressed as a sum of Feynman diagrams, calculated using the following Feynman rules:

- Each field (p) in the n-point Euclidean Green's function is represented by an external line (half-edge) in the graph, and associated with momentum p.
- Each vertex is represented by a factor −g.
- At a given order g^{k}, all diagrams with n external lines and k vertices are constructed such that the momenta flowing into each vertex is zero. Each internal line is represented by a propagator 1/(q^{2} + m^{2}), where q is the momentum flowing through that line.
- Any unconstrained momenta are integrated over all values.
- The result is divided by a symmetry factor, which is the number of ways the lines and vertices of the graph can be rearranged without changing its connectivity.
- Do not include graphs containing "vacuum bubbles", connected subgraphs with no external lines.

The last rule takes into account the effect of dividing by [0]. The Minkowski-space Feynman rules are similar, except that each vertex is represented by −ig, while each internal line is represented by a propagator i/(q^{2}−m^{2}+iε), where the ε term represents the small Wick rotation needed to make the Minkowski-space Gaussian integral converge.

=== Renormalization ===
The integrals over unconstrained momenta, called "loop integrals", in the Feynman graphs typically diverge. This is normally handled by renormalization, which is a procedure of adding divergent counter-terms to the Lagrangian in such a way that the diagrams constructed from the original Lagrangian and counter-terms is finite. A renormalization scale must be introduced in the process, and the coupling constant and mass become dependent upon it.

The dependence of a coupling constant g on the scale λ is encoded by a beta function, β(g), defined by

$$\beta(g) = \lambda\,\frac{\partial g}{\partial \lambda} ~.$$

This dependence on the energy scale is known as "the running of the coupling parameter", and theory of this systematic scale-dependence in quantum field theory is described by the renormalization group.

Beta-functions are usually computed in an approximation scheme, most commonly perturbation theory, where one assumes that the coupling constant is small. One can then make an expansion in powers of the coupling parameters and truncate the higher-order terms (also known as higher loop contributions, due to the number of loops in the corresponding Feynman graphs).

The β-function at one loop (the first perturbative contribution) for the φ^{4} theory is

$$\beta(g) = \frac{3}{16\pi^2}g^2 + O\left(g^3\right) ~.$$

The fact that the sign in front of the lowest-order term is positive suggests that the coupling constant increases with energy. If this behavior persisted at large couplings, this would indicate the presence of a Landau pole at finite energy, arising from quantum triviality. However, the question can only be answered non-perturbatively, since it involves strong coupling.

A quantum field theory is said to be trivial when the renormalized coupling, computed through its beta function, goes to zero when the ultraviolet cutoff is removed. Consequently, the propagator becomes that of a free particle and the field is no longer interacting.

For a φ^{4} interaction, Michael Aizenman proved that the theory is indeed trivial, for space-time dimension D ≥ 5.

== See also ==
- Renormalization
- Landau pole
- Scale invariance (CFT description)
- Scalar electrodynamics
