= Banks–Zaks fixed point =

Conformal fixed point in certain Yang–Mills theories

In quantum chromodynamics (and also N = 1 super quantum chromodynamics) with massless flavors, if the number of flavors, N_{f}, is sufficiently small (i.e. small enough to guarantee asymptotic freedom, depending on the number of colors), the theory can flow to an interacting conformal fixed point of the renormalization group. If the value of the coupling at that point is less than one (i.e. one can perform perturbation theory in weak coupling), then the fixed point is called a Banks–Zaks fixed point. The existence of the fixed point was first reported in 1974 by Alexander Belavin and Alexander A. Migdal and by William E. Caswell, and later used by Tom Banks and Alex Zaks in their analysis of the phase structure of vector-like gauge theories with massless fermions. The name Caswell–Banks–Zaks fixed point is also used.

== Description ==
Suppose that we find that the beta function of a theory up to two loops has the form

$$\beta(g) = -b_0 g^3 + b_1 g^5 + \mathcal{O}(g^7) \,$$

where $b_0$ and $b_1$ are positive constants. Then there exists a value $g=g_\ast$ such that $\beta(g_\ast) =0$:

$$g_\ast^2 = \frac{b_0}{b_1}.$$

If we can arrange $b_0$ to be smaller than $b_1$, then we have $g^2_\ast <1$. It follows that when the theory flows to the IR it is a conformal, weakly coupled theory with coupling $g_\ast$.

For the case of a non-Abelian gauge theory with gauge group $SU(N_c)$ and Dirac fermions in the fundamental representation of the gauge group for the flavored particles we have

$$b_0 = \frac{1}{16\pi^2}\frac{1}{3}(11N_c-2N_f) \;\;\;\; \text{      and       }\;\;\;\; b_1 = -\frac{1}{(16\pi^2)^2}\left(\frac{34}{3}N_c^2 - \frac{1}{2}N_f\left(2 \frac{N_c^2 -1}{N_c} + \frac{20}{3}N_c \right) \right)$$

where $N_c$ is the number of colors and $N_f$ the number of flavors. Then $N_f$ should lie just below $\tfrac{11}{2}N_c$ in order for the Banks–Zaks fixed point to appear. Note that this fixed point only occurs if, in addition to the previous requirement on $N_f$ (which guarantees asymptotic freedom),

$$\frac{11}{2}N_c>N_f>\frac{34N_c^3}{(13N_c^2-3)}$$

where the lower bound comes from requiring $b_1>0$. This way $b_1$ remains positive while $-b_0$ is still negative (see first equation in article) and one can solve $\beta (g) = 0$ with real solutions for $g$. The coefficient $b_1$ was first correctly computed by Caswell, while the earlier paper by Belavin and Migdal has a wrong answer.

== See also ==
- Beta function
