= Cutoff (physics) =

Maximum or minimum values of quantities

In theoretical physics, cutoff (AE: cutoff, BE: cut-off) is an arbitrary maximal or minimal value of energy, momentum, or length, used in order that objects with larger or smaller values than these physical quantities are ignored in some calculation. It is usually represented within a particular energy or length scale, such as Planck units.

When used in this context, the traditional terms "infrared" and "ultraviolet" are not literal references to specific regions of the spectrum, but rather refer by analogy to portions of a calculation for low energies (infrared) and high energies (ultraviolet), respectively.

== Infrared and ultraviolet cutoff ==
An infrared cutoff (long-distance cutoff) is the minimal value of energy – or, equivalently, the maximal wavelength (usually a very large distance) – that will be taken into account in a calculation, typically an integral.

At the opposite end of the energy scale, an ultraviolet cutoff is the maximal allowed energy or the shortest allowed distance (usually a very short length scale). An example of this is "the maximum energy the classically driven photoelectron can convert into a photon energy." This "cutoff formula", most importantly, can be experimentally verified.

== Effect on calculation ==
A typical use of cutoffs is to prevent singularities from appearing during calculation. If some quantities are computed as integrals over energy or another physical quantity, these cutoffs determine the limits of integration. The exact physics is reproduced when the appropriate cutoffs are sent to zero or infinity. However, these integrals are often divergent – see IR divergence and UV divergence – and a cutoff is needed. The dependence of physical quantities on the chosen cutoffs (especially the ultraviolet cutoffs) is the main focus of the theory of the renormalization group.

== See also ==
- Infrared fixed point
- Ultraviolet fixed point

== Bibliography ==
- J.C. Collins, "Renormalization", Cambridge University Press, Cambridge, 1984.
- "G. 't Hooft, M.Veltman, "Diagrammar", CERN Report 73-9, 1973".
- M.J. Veltman, "Diagrammatica", The path to Feynman diagrams, Cambridge University Press, Cambridge, 1995.
- L.S. Brown, "Quantum field theory", Cambridge University Press, Cambridge, 1992.
- M.E. Peskin, D.V. Schroeder, "An introduction to quantum field theory", Westview Press, 1995.
- C. Itzykson and J.B. Zuber, "Quantum field theory", Mcgraw-hill, New York, 1980.
- S. Weinberg, "The quantum theory of fields", Cambridge University Press, Cambridge, 2000.
