= Length scale =

Particular length or distance determined with the precision of a few orders of magnitude

In physics, length scale is a particular length or distance determined with the precision of at most a few orders of magnitude. The concept of length scale is particularly important because physical phenomena of different length scales are said to decouple, i.e. they can be separated and studied independently. In other words, the decoupling of different length scales makes it possible to have a self-consistent theory that only describes the relevant length scales for a given problem. Scientific reductionism says that the physical laws on the shortest length scales can be used to derive the effective description at larger length scales. The idea that one can derive descriptions of physics at different length scales from one another can be quantified with the renormalization group.

In quantum mechanics the length scale of a given phenomenon is related to its de Broglie wavelength ℓ = ħ/p, where ħ is the reduced Planck constant and p is the momentum that is being probed. In relativistic mechanics time and length scales are related by the speed of light. In relativistic quantum mechanics or relativistic quantum field theory, length scales are related to momentum, time and energy scales through the Planck constant and the speed of light. Often in high energy physics natural units are used where length, time, energy and momentum scales are described in the same units (usually with units of energy such as GeV).

Length scales are usually the operative scale (or at least one of the scales) in dimensional analysis. For instance, in scattering theory, the most common quantity to calculate is a cross section which has units of length squared and is measured in barns. The cross section of a given process is usually the square of the length scale.

== Examples ==
- The atomic length scale is ℓ_{a} ~ 10^{−10} m and is given by the size of hydrogen atom (i.e., the Bohr radius, approximately 53 pm).
- The length scale for the strong interactions (or the one derived from QCD through dimensional transmutation) is around ℓ_{s} ~ 10^{−15} m, and the "radii" of strongly interacting particles (such as the proton) are roughly comparable. This length scale is determined by the range of the Yukawa potential. The lifetimes of strongly interacting particles, such as the rho meson, are given by this length scale divided by the speed of light: 10^{−23} s. The masses of strongly interacting particles are several times the associated energy scale (500 MeV/c^{2} to 3000 MeV/c^{2}).
- The electroweak length scale is shorter, roughly ℓ_{w} ~ 10^{−18} m and is set by the rest mass of the weak vector bosons, which is roughly 100 GeV/c^{2}. This length scale would be the distance where a Yukawa force is mediated by the weak vector bosons. The magnitude of weak length scale was initially inferred by the Fermi constant measured by neutron and muon decay.
- The Planck length (Planck scale) is much shorter yet – about ℓ_{P} ~ 10^{−35} m, and is derived from the Newtonian constant of gravitation, the Planck constant and the speed of light.
- The Stoney length (Stoney scale) is shorter yet – about ℓ_{S} ~ 10^{−36} m.
- The mesoscopic scale is the length at which quantum mechanical behaviour in liquids or solids can be described by macroscopic concepts.

== See also ==
- Orders of magnitude (length)
- Extragalactic distance scale
- Scale height
