= Callan–Symanzik equation =

Evolutionary equation under renormalization group flow

In physics, the Callan–Symanzik equation is a differential equation describing the evolution of the n-point correlation functions under variation of the energy scale at which the theory is defined and involves the beta function of the theory and the anomalous dimensions.

The Callan–Symanzik equation was discovered independently by Curtis Callan and Kurt Symanzik in 1970. Later it was used to understand asymptotic freedom.

This equation arises in the framework of renormalization group. It is possible to treat the equation using perturbation theory.

== Example ==
As an example, for a quantum field theory with one massless scalar field and one self-coupling term, denote the bare field strength by $\phi_0$ and the bare coupling constant by $g_0$. In the process of renormalization, a mass scale M must be chosen. Depending on M, the field strength is rescaled by a constant: $\phi = Z\phi_0$, and as a result the bare coupling constant $g_0$ is correspondingly shifted to the renormalised coupling constant g.

Of physical importance are the renormalised n-point functions, computed from connected Feynman diagrams, schematically of the form

$$G^{(n)}(x_1,x_2,\ldots,x_n;M,g) = \langle \phi(x_1)\phi(x_2)\cdots\phi(x_n)\rangle$$

For a given choice of renormalisation scheme, the computation of this quantity depends on the choice of M, which affects the shift in g and the rescaling of $\phi$. If the choice of $M$ is slightly altered by $\delta M$, then the following shifts will occur:

$$M\to M + \delta M$$
$$g\to g + \delta g$$
$$\phi = Z\phi_0 \to Z'\phi_0 = (1+\delta\eta)\phi$$
$$G^{(n)} \to (1+n\,\delta\eta)G^{(n)}$$

The Callan–Symanzik equation relates these shifts:

$$n\,\delta\eta G^{(n)} = \frac{\partial G^{(n)}}{\partial M}\delta M + \frac{\partial G^{(n)}}{\partial g}\delta g$$

After the following definitions

$$\beta = \frac{M}{\delta M}\delta g$$
$$\gamma = -\frac{M}{\delta M}\delta\eta$$

the Callan–Symanzik equation can be put in the conventional form:

$$\left[M\frac{\partial }{\partial M}+\beta(g)\frac{\partial }{\partial g}+n\gamma\right] G^{(n)}(x_1,x_2,\ldots,x_n;M,g)=0$$

$\beta(g)$ being the beta function.

In quantum electrodynamics this equation takes the form

$$\left[M\frac{\partial }{\partial M}+\beta(e)\frac{\partial }{\partial e}+n\gamma_2 +m\gamma_3\right]G^{(n,m)}(x_1,x_2,\ldots,x_n;y_1,y_2,\ldots,y_m;M,e)=0$$

where n and m are the numbers of electron and photon fields, respectively, for which the correlation function $G^{(n,m)}$ is defined. The renormalised coupling constant is now the renormalised elementary charge e. The electron field and the photon field rescale differently under renormalisation, and thus lead to two separate functions, $\gamma_2$ and $\gamma_3$, respectively.

== See also ==
- Renormalization group
- Beta function
