= Landau pole =

Coupling constant divergence at high energies

In physics, the Landau pole (or the Moscow zero, or the Landau ghost) is the momentum (or energy) scale at which the coupling constant (interaction strength) of a quantum field theory becomes infinite. Such a possibility was pointed out by the physicist Lev Landau and his colleagues in 1954. The fact that couplings depend on the momentum (or length) scale is the central idea behind the renormalization group.

Landau poles appear in theories that are not asymptotically free, such as quantum electrodynamics (QED) or φ^{4} theory—a scalar field with a quartic interaction—such as ones that may describe the Higgs boson. In these theories, the renormalized coupling constant grows with energy. A Landau pole appears when the coupling becomes infinite at a finite energy scale. In a theory purporting to be complete, this could be considered a mathematical inconsistency. A possible solution is that the renormalized charge could go to zero as the cut-off is removed, meaning that the charge is completely screened by quantum fluctuations (vacuum polarization). This is a case of quantum triviality, which means that quantum corrections completely suppress the interactions in the absence of a cut-off.

Since the Landau pole is normally identified through perturbative one-loop or two-loop calculations, it is possible that the pole is merely a sign that the perturbative approximation breaks down at strong coupling. Perturbation theory may also be invalid if non-adiabatic states exist. However, lattice gauge theory provides a means to address questions in quantum field theory beyond the realm of perturbation theory, and numerical computations performed in this framework seem to confirm Landau's conclusion that in QED the renormalized charge completely vanishes for an infinite cutoff.

== Brief history ==
According to Landau, Alexei Abrikosov, and Isaak Khalatnikov, the relation of the observable charge g_{obs} to the "bare" charge g_{0} for renormalizable field theories when Λ ≫ m is given by

$$g_\text{obs}=\frac{g_0}{1+\beta_2 g_0 \ln \Lambda/m}$$	1

where m is the mass of the particle and Λ is the momentum cut-off. If g_{0} < ∞ and Λ → ∞ then g_{obs} → 0 and the theory looks trivial. In fact, inverting Eq. 1, so that g_{0} (related to the length scale Λ^{−1}) reveals an accurate value of g_{obs},

$$g_0 = \frac{g_\text{obs}}{1-\beta_2 g_\text{obs} \ln \Lambda/m}.$$	2

As Λ grows, the bare charge g_{0} = g(Λ) increases, to finally diverge at the renormalization point

$$\Lambda_\text{Landau} = m \exp\left[ \frac{1}{\beta_2 g_\text{obs}} \right].$$	3

This singularity is the Landau pole with a negative residue, g(Λ) ≈ −Λ_{Landau} / (β_{2}(Λ − Λ_{Landau})).

In fact, however, the growth of g_{0} invalidates Eqs. 1, 2 in the region g_{0} ≈ 1, since these were obtained for g_{0} ≪ 1, so that the nonperturbative existence of the Landau pole becomes questionable.

The actual behavior of the charge g(μ) as a function of the momentum scale μ is determined by the Gell-Mann–Low equation (named after Murray Gell-Mann and Francis E. Low)

$$\frac{\mathrm{d}g}{\mathrm{d} \ln \mu} = \beta(g) = \beta_2 g^2 + \beta_3 g^3 + \cdots$$	4

which gives Eqs. 1, 2 if it is integrated under conditions g(μ) = g_{obs} for μ = m and g(μ) = g_{0} for μ = Λ, when only the term with β_{2} is retained in the right hand side. The general behavior of g(μ) depends on the appearance of the function β(g).

According to the classification of Nikolay Bogolyubov and Dmitry Shirkov, there are three qualitatively different cases:

1. if β(g) has a zero at the finite value g^{∗}, then growth of g is saturated, i.e. g(μ) → g^{∗} for μ → ∞;
2. if β(g) is non-alternating and behaves as β(g) ∝ g^{α} with α ≤ 1 for large g, then the growth of g(μ) continues to infinity;
3. if β(g) ∝ g^{α} with α > 1 for large g, then g(μ) is divergent at finite value μ_{0} and the real Landau pole arises: the theory is internally inconsistent due to indeterminacy of g(μ) for μ > μ_{0}.

Landau and Isaak Pomeranchuk tried to justify the possibility (c) in the case of QED and φ^{4} theory. They have noted that the growth of g_{0} in Eq. 1 drives the observable charge g_{obs} to the constant limit, which does not depend on g_{0}. The same behavior can be obtained from the functional integrals, omitting the quadratic terms in the action. If neglecting the quadratic terms is valid already for g_{0} ≪ 1, it is all the more valid for g_{0} of the order or greater than unity: it gives a reason to consider Eq. 1 to be valid for arbitrary g_{0}. Validity of these considerations at the quantitative level is excluded by the non-quadratic form of the β-function.

Nevertheless, they can be correct qualitatively. Indeed, the result g_{obs} = const(g_{0}) can be obtained from the functional integrals only for g_{0} ≫ 1, while its validity for g_{0} ≪ 1, based on Eq. 1, may be related to other reasons; for g_{0} ≈ 1 this result is probably violated but coincidence of two constant values in the order of magnitude can be expected from the matching condition. The Monte Carlo results seems to confirm the qualitative validity of the Landau–Pomeranchuk arguments, although a different interpretation is also possible.

The case (c) in the Bogoliubov and Shirkov classification corresponds to the quantum triviality in full theory (beyond its perturbation context), as can be seen by a reductio ad absurdum. Indeed, if g_{obs} < ∞, the theory is internally inconsistent. The only way to avoid it, is for μ_{0} → ∞, which is possible only for g_{obs} → 0. It is a widespread belief that both QED and φ^{4} theory are trivial in the continuum limit.

== Phenomenological aspects ==
In a theory intended to represent a physical interaction where the coupling constant is known to be non-zero, Landau poles or triviality may be viewed as a sign of incompleteness in the theory. For example, QED is usually not believed to be a complete theory on its own, because it does not describe other fundamental interactions, and contains a Landau pole. Conventionally QED forms part of the more fundamental electroweak theory. The U(1)_{Y} group of electroweak theory also has a Landau pole which is usually considered to be a signal of a need for an ultimate embedding into a Grand Unified Theory. The grand unified scale would provide a natural cutoff well below the Landau scale, preventing the pole from having observable physical consequences.

The problem of the Landau pole in QED is of purely academic interest, for the following reason. The role of g_{obs} in Eqs. 1, 2 is played by the fine structure constant α ≈ 1/137 and the Landau scale for QED is estimated as 10^{286} eV, which is far beyond any energy scale relevant to observable physics. For comparison, the maximum energies accessible at the Large Hadron Collider are of order 10^{13} eV, while the Planck scale, at which quantum gravity becomes important and the relevance of quantum field theory itself may be questioned, is 10^{28} eV. The energy of the observable universe is on the order of 10^{88} eV.

The Higgs boson in the Standard Model of particle physics is described by φ^{4} theory (see Quartic interaction). If the latter has a Landau pole, then this fact is used in setting a "triviality bound" on the Higgs mass. The bound depends on the scale at which new physics is assumed to enter and the maximum value of the quartic coupling permitted (its physical value is unknown). For large couplings, non-perturbative methods are required. This can even lead to a predictable Higgs mass in asymptotic safety scenarios. Lattice calculations have also been useful in this context.

== Connections with statistical physics ==
A deeper understanding of the physical meaning and generalization of the renormalization process leading to Landau poles comes from condensed matter physics. Leo P. Kadanoff's paper in 1966 proposed the "block-spin" renormalization group. The blocking idea is a way to define the components of the theory at large distances as aggregates of components at shorter distances. This approach was developed by Kenneth Wilson. He was awarded the Nobel prize for these decisive contributions in 1982.

Assume that we have a theory described by a certain function Z of the state variables {s_{i}} and a set of coupling constants {J_{k}}. This function can be a partition function, an action, or a Hamiltonian. Consider a certain blocking transformation of the state variables {s_{i}} → {}, the number of must be lower than the number of s_{i}. Now let us try to rewrite Z only in terms of the. If this is achievable by a certain change in the parameters, {J_{k}} → {}, then the theory is said to be renormalizable. The most important information in the RG flow are its fixed points. The possible macroscopic states of the system, at a large scale, are given by this set of fixed points. If these fixed points correspond to a free field theory, the theory is said to exhibit quantum triviality, and possesses a Landau pole. Numerous fixed points appear in the study of lattice Higgs theories, but it is not known whether these correspond to free field theories.

== Large order perturbative calculations ==
Solution of the Landau pole problem requires the calculation of the Gell-Mann–Low function β(g) at arbitrary g and, in particular, its asymptotic behavior for g → ∞. Diagrammatic calculations allow one to obtain only a few expansion coefficients β_{2}, β_{3}, ..., which do not allow one to investigate the β function in the whole. Progress became possible after the development of the Lipatov method (by Lev Lipatov) for calculating large orders of perturbation theory: One may now try to interpolate the known coefficients β_{2}, β_{3}, ... with their large order behavior, and to then sum the perturbation series.

The first attempts of reconstruction of the β function by this method bear on the triviality of the φ^{4} theory. Application of more advanced summation methods gave the exponent $\alpha$ in the asymptotic behavior $\beta(g) \propto g^\alpha$ a value close to unity both in $\phi^4$ theory and QED . The first result was also confirmed by summation of high temperature series adjusted to reproduce the small $g$ behavior. The hypothesis for the linear strong coupling asymptotics $\beta(g) \propto g$ was recently confirmed analytically for $\phi^4$ theory and QED . Together with positiveness of $\beta(g)$, obtained by summation of series, it gives the case (b) of the Bogoliubov and Shirkov classification, and hence the Landau pole is absent in these theories.

== See also ==
- Pole mass
- Quantum triviality
