= Scaling dimension =

Number specifying how a quantum operator changes under dilations

In theoretical physics, the scaling dimension, or simply dimension, of a local operator in a quantum field theory characterizes the rescaling properties of the operator under spacetime dilations $x\to \lambda x$. If the quantum field theory is scale invariant, scaling dimensions of operators are fixed numbers, otherwise they are functions of the distance scale.

== Scale-invariant quantum field theory ==
In a scale invariant quantum field theory, by definition each operator $O$ acquires under a dilation $x\to \lambda x$ a factor $\lambda^{-\Delta}$, where $\Delta$ is a number called the scaling dimension of $O$. This implies in particular that the two point correlation function $\langle O(x) O(0)\rangle$ depends on the distance as $(x^2)^{-\Delta}$. More generally, correlation functions of several local operators must depend on the distances in such a way that $\langle O_1(\lambda x_1) O_2(\lambda x_2)\ldots\rangle= \lambda^{-\Delta_1-\Delta_2-\ldots}\langle O_1(x_1) O_2(x_2)\ldots\rangle$

Most scale invariant theories are also conformally invariant, which imposes further constraints on correlation functions of local operators.

=== Free field theories ===
Free theories are the simplest scale-invariant quantum field theories. In free theories, one makes a distinction between the elementary operators, which are the fields appearing in the Lagrangian, and the composite operators which are products of the elementary ones. The scaling dimension of an elementary operator $O$ is determined by dimensional analysis from the Lagrangian (in four spacetime dimensions, it is 1 for elementary bosonic fields including the vector potentials, 3/2 for elementary fermionic fields etc.). This scaling dimension is called the classical dimension (the terms canonical dimension and engineering dimension are also used). A composite operator obtained by taking a product of two operators of dimensions $\Delta_1$ and $\Delta_2$ is a new operator whose dimension is the sum $\Delta_1+\Delta_2$.

When interactions are turned on, the scaling dimension receives a correction called the anomalous dimension (see below).

=== Interacting field theories ===
There are many scale invariant quantum field theories which are not free theories; these are called interacting. Scaling dimensions of operators in such theories may not be read off from a Lagrangian; they are also not necessarily (half)integer. For example, in the scale (and conformally) invariant theory describing the critical points of the two-dimensional Ising model there is an operator $\sigma$ whose dimension is 1/8.

Operator multiplication is subtle in interacting theories compared to free theories. The operator product expansion of two operators with dimensions $\Delta_1$ and $\Delta_2$ will generally give not a unique operator but infinitely many operators, and their dimension will not generally be equal to $\Delta_1+\Delta_2$. In the above two-dimensional Ising model example, the operator product $\sigma \times\sigma$ gives an operator $\epsilon$ whose dimension is 1 and not twice the dimension of $\sigma$.

== Non scale-invariant quantum field theory ==
There are many quantum field theories which, while not being exactly scale invariant, remain approximately scale invariant over a long range of distances. Such quantum field theories can be obtained by adding to free field theories interaction terms with small dimensionless couplings. For example, in four spacetime dimensions one can add quartic scalar couplings, Yukawa couplings, or gauge couplings. Scaling dimensions of operators in such theories can be expressed schematically as $\Delta=\Delta_0 + \gamma(g)$, where $\Delta_0$ is the dimension when all couplings are set to zero (i.e. the classical dimension), while $\gamma(g)$ is called the anomalous dimension, and is expressed as a power series in the couplings collectively denoted as $g$. Such a separation of scaling dimensions into the classical and anomalous part is only meaningful when couplings are small, so that $\gamma(g)$ is a small correction.

Generally, due to quantum mechanical effects, the couplings $g$ do not remain constant, but vary (in the jargon of quantum field theory, run) with the distance scale according to their beta-function. Therefore the anomalous dimension $\gamma(g)$ also depends on the distance scale in such theories. In particular correlation functions of local operators are no longer simple powers but have a more complicated dependence on the distances, generally with logarithmic corrections.

It may happen that the evolution of the couplings will lead to a value $g=g_*$ where the beta-function vanishes. Then at long distances the theory becomes scale invariant, and the anomalous dimensions stop running. Such a behavior is called an infrared fixed point.

In very special cases, it may happen when the couplings and the anomalous dimensions do not run at all, so that the theory is scale invariant at all distances and for any value of the coupling. For example, this occurs in the N=4 supersymmetric Yang–Mills theory.
