= Asymptotic freedom =

Property of gauge theories in particle physics

In quantum field theory, asymptotic freedom is a property of some gauge theories that causes interactions between particles to become weaker as the energy scale increases and the corresponding length scale decreases.

Asymptotic freedom is a feature of quantum chromodynamics (QCD), the quantum field theory of the strong interaction between quarks and gluons, the fundamental constituents of nuclear matter. Quarks interact weakly at high energies, allowing perturbative calculations. At low energies, the interaction becomes strong, leading to the confinement of quarks and gluons within composite hadrons.

The asymptotic freedom of QCD was discovered in 1973 by David Gross and Frank Wilczek, and independently by David Politzer in the same year. For this work all three shared the 2004 Nobel Prize in Physics.

== Discovery ==
Asymptotic freedom in QCD was discovered in 1973 by David Gross and Frank Wilczek, and independently by David Politzer in the same year. The same phenomenon had previously been observed (in quantum electrodynamics with a charged vector field, by V.S. Vanyashin and M.V. Terent'ev in 1965; and Yang–Mills theory by Iosif Khriplovich in 1969 and Gerard 't Hooft in 1972), but its physical significance was not realized until the work of Gross, Wilczek and Politzer, which was recognized by the 2004 Nobel Prize in Physics.

Experiments at the Stanford Linear Accelerator showed that inside protons, quarks behaved as if they were free. This was a great surprise, as many believed quarks to be tightly bound by the strong interaction, and so they should rapidly dissipate their motion by strong interaction radiation when they were violently accelerated, much like how electrons emit electromagnetic radiation when accelerated.

The discovery was instrumental in "rehabilitating" quantum field theory. Prior to 1973, many theorists suspected that field theory was fundamentally inconsistent because the interactions become infinitely strong at short distances. This phenomenon is usually called a Landau pole, and it defines the smallest length scale that a theory can describe. This problem was discovered in field theories of interacting scalars and spinors, including quantum electrodynamics (QED), and Lehmann positivity led many to suspect that it is unavoidable. Asymptotically free theories become weak at short distances, there is no Landau pole, and these quantum field theories are believed to be completely consistent down to any length scale.

Electroweak theory within the Standard Model is not asymptotically free. So a Landau pole exists in the Standard Model. With the Landau pole a problem arises when the Higgs boson is being considered. Quantum triviality can be used to bound or predict parameters such as the Higgs boson mass. This leads to a predictable Higgs mass in asymptotic safety scenarios. In other scenarios, interactions are weak so that any inconsistency arises at distances shorter than the Planck length.

== Screening and antiscreening ==
Charge screening in QED

The variation in a physical coupling constant under changes of scale can be understood qualitatively as coming from the action of the field on virtual particles carrying the relevant charge. The Landau pole behavior of QED (related to quantum triviality) is a consequence of screening by virtual charged particle–antiparticle pairs, such as electron–positron pairs, in the vacuum. In the vicinity of a charge, the vacuum becomes polarized: virtual particles of opposing charge are attracted to the charge, and virtual particles of like charge are repelled. The net effect is to partially cancel out the field at any finite distance. Getting closer and closer to the central charge, one sees less and less of the effect of the vacuum, and the effective charge increases.

In QCD the same thing happens with virtual quark-antiquark pairs; they tend to screen the color charge. However, QCD has an additional wrinkle: its force-carrying particles, the gluons, themselves carry color charge, and in a different manner. Each gluon carries both a color charge and an anti-color magnetic moment. The net effect of polarization of virtual gluons in the vacuum is not to screen the field but to augment it and change its color. This is sometimes called antiscreening (color paramagnetism). Getting closer to a quark diminishes the antiscreening effect of the surrounding virtual gluons, so the contribution of this effect would be to weaken the effective charge with decreasing distance.

Since the virtual quarks and the virtual gluons contribute opposite effects, which effect wins out depends on the number of different kinds, or flavors, of quark. For standard QCD with three colors, as long as there are no more than 16 flavors of quark (not counting the antiquarks separately), antiscreening prevails and the theory is asymptotically free. In fact, there are only 6 known quark flavors.

== Calculating asymptotic freedom ==
Asymptotic freedom can be derived by calculating the beta function describing the variation of the theory's coupling constant under the renormalization group. For sufficiently short distances or large exchanges of momentum (which probe short-distance behavior, roughly because of the inverse relationship between a quantum's momentum and De Broglie wavelength), an asymptotically free theory is amenable to perturbation theory calculations using Feynman diagrams. Such situations are therefore more theoretically tractable than the long-distance, strong-coupling behavior also often present in such theories, which is thought to produce confinement.

Calculating the beta-function is a matter of evaluating Feynman diagrams contributing to the interaction of a quark emitting or absorbing a gluon. Essentially, the beta-function describes how the coupling constants vary as one scales the system $x \rightarrow bx$. The calculation can be done using rescaling in position space or momentum space (momentum shell integration). In non-abelian gauge theories such as QCD, the existence of asymptotic freedom depends on the gauge group and number of flavors of interacting particles. To lowest nontrivial order, the beta-function in an SU(N) gauge theory with $n_f$ kinds of quark-like particle is

$$\beta_1(\alpha) = { \alpha^2 \over \pi} \left( -{11N \over 6} + {n_f \over 3} \right)$$

where $\alpha$ is the theory's equivalent of the fine-structure constant, $g^2/(4 \pi)$ in the units favored by particle physicists. If this function is negative, the theory is asymptotically free. For SU(3), one has $N = 3,$ and the requirement that $\beta_1 < 0$ gives

$$n_f < {33 \over 2}.$$

Thus for SU(3), the color charge gauge group of QCD, the theory is asymptotically free if there are 16 or fewer flavors of quarks.

Besides QCD, asymptotic freedom can also be seen in other systems like the nonlinear $\sigma$-model in 2 dimensions, which has a structure similar to the SU(n) invariant Yang–Mills theory in 4 dimensions.

== See also ==
- Asymptotic safety
- Gluon field strength tensor
- Quantum triviality
