= Coupling constant =

Parameter describing the strength of a force

In physics, a coupling constant or gauge coupling parameter (or, more simply, a coupling) is a number that determines the strength of the force exerted in an interaction. Originally, the coupling constant related the force acting between two static bodies to the "charges" of the bodies (i.e. the electric charge for electrostatic and the mass for Newtonian gravity) divided by the distance squared, $r^2$, between the bodies; thus: $G$ in $F=G m_1 m_2/r^2$ for Newtonian gravity and $k_\text{e}$ in $F=k_\text{e}q_1 q_2/r^2$ for electrostatic. This description remains valid in modern physics for linear theories with static bodies and massless force carriers.

A modern and more general definition uses the Lagrangian $\mathcal{L}$ (or equivalently the Hamiltonian $\mathcal{H}$) of a system. Usually, $\mathcal{L}$ (or $\mathcal{H}$) of a system describing an interaction can be separated into a kinetic part $T$ and an interaction part $V$: $\mathcal{L}=T-V$ (or $\mathcal{H}=T+V$). In field theory, $V$ always contains 3 fields terms or more, expressing for example that an initial electron (field 1) interacts with a photon (field 2) producing the final state of the electron (field 3). In contrast, the kinetic part $T$ always contains only two fields, expressing the free propagation of an initial particle (field 1) into a later state (field 2). The coupling constant determines the magnitude of the $T$ part with respect to the $V$ part (or between two sectors of the interaction part if several fields that couple differently are present). For example, the electric charge of a particle is a coupling constant that characterizes an interaction with two charge-carrying fields and one photon field (hence the common Feynman diagram with two arrows and one wavy line). Since photons mediate the electromagnetic force, this coupling determines how strongly electrons feel such a force, and has its value fixed by experiment. By looking at the QED Lagrangian, one sees that indeed, the coupling sets the proportionality between the kinetic term $T = \bar \psi (i\hbar c \gamma^\sigma\partial_\sigma - mc^2) \psi - {1 \over 4\mu_0} F_{\mu \nu} F^{\mu \nu}$ and the interaction term $V = - e\bar \psi (\hbar c \gamma^\sigma A_\sigma) \psi$.

A coupling plays an important role in dynamics. For example, one often sets up hierarchies of approximation based on the importance of various coupling constants. In the motion of a large lump of magnetized iron, the magnetic forces may be more important than the gravitational forces because of the relative magnitudes of the coupling constants. However, in classical mechanics, one usually makes these decisions directly by comparing forces. Another important example of the central role played by coupling constants is that they are the expansion parameters for first-principle calculations based on perturbation theory, which is the main method of calculation in many branches of physics.

== Fine-structure constant ==
Couplings arise naturally in a quantum field theory. A special role is played in relativistic quantum theories by couplings that are dimensionless; i.e., are pure numbers. An example of such a dimensionless constant is the fine-structure constant,

$$\alpha = \frac{e^2}{4\pi\varepsilon_0\hbar c} ,$$

where e is the charge of an electron, ε_{0} is the permittivity of free space, ħ is the reduced Planck constant and c is the speed of light. This constant is proportional to the square of the coupling strength of the charge of an electron to the electromagnetic field.

== Gauge coupling ==
In a non-abelian gauge theory, the gauge coupling parameter, $g$, appears in the Lagrangian as

$$\frac1{4g^2}{\rm Tr}\,G_{\mu\nu}G^{\mu\nu},$$

(where G is the gauge field tensor) in some conventions. In another widely used convention, G is rescaled so that the coefficient of the kinetic term is 1/4 and $g$ appears in the covariant derivative. This should be understood to be similar to a dimensionless version of the elementary charge defined as

$$\frac{e}{\sqrt{\varepsilon_0\hbar c}} = \sqrt{4\pi\alpha} \approx 0.30282212 \   ~~.$$

== Weak and strong coupling ==
In a quantum field theory with a coupling g, if g is much less than 1, the theory is said to be weakly coupled. In this case, it is well described by an expansion in powers of g, called perturbation theory. If the coupling constant is of order one or larger, the theory is said to be strongly coupled. An example of the latter is the hadronic theory of strong interactions (which is why it is called strong in the first place). In such a case, non-perturbative methods need to be used to investigate the theory.

In quantum field theory, the dimension of the coupling plays an important role in the renormalizability property of the theory, and therefore on the applicability of perturbation theory. If the coupling is dimensionless in the natural units system (i.e. $c=1$, $\hbar=1$), like in QED, QCD, and the weak interaction, the theory is renormalizable and all the terms of the expansion series are finite (after renormalization). If the coupling is dimensionful, as e.g. in gravity ($[G_N]=\text{energy}^{-2}$), the Fermi theory ($[G_F]=\text{energy}^{-2}$) or the chiral perturbation theory of the strong force ($[F]=\text{energy}$), then the theory is usually not renormalizable. Perturbation expansions in the coupling might still be feasible, albeit within limitations, as most of the higher order terms of the series will be infinite.

== Running coupling ==
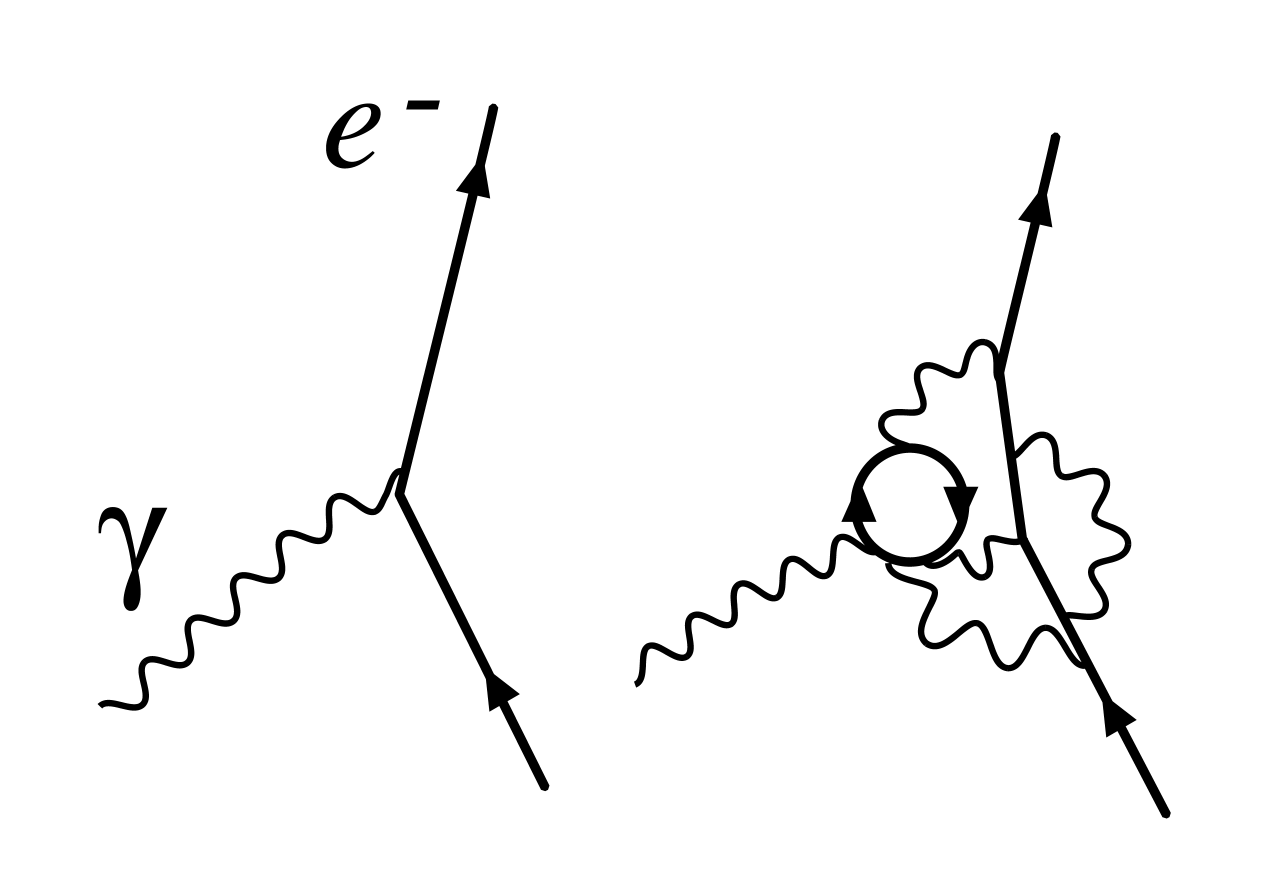
Fig. 1 Virtual particles renormalize the coupling

One may probe a quantum field theory at short times or distances by changing the wavelength or momentum, k, of the probe used. With a high frequency (i.e., short time) probe, one sees virtual particles taking part in every process. This apparent violation of the conservation of energy may be understood heuristically by examining the uncertainty relation

$$\Delta E\Delta t \ge \frac{\hbar}{2},$$

which virtually allows such violations at short times. The foregoing remark only applies to some formulations of quantum field theory, in particular, canonical quantization in the interaction picture.

In other formulations, the same event is described by "virtual" particles going off the mass shell. Such processes renormalize the coupling and make it dependent on the energy scale, μ, at which one probes the coupling. The dependence of a coupling g(μ) on the energy-scale is known as "running of the coupling". The theory of the running of couplings is given by the renormalization group, though it should be kept in mind that the renormalization group is a more general concept describing any sort of scale variation in a physical system (see the full article for details).

=== Phenomenology of the running of a coupling ===
The renormalization group provides a formal way to derive the running of a coupling, yet the phenomenology underlying that running can be understood intuitively. As explained in the introduction, the coupling constant sets the magnitude of a force which behaves with distance as $1/r^2$. The $1/r^2$-dependence was first explained by Faraday as the decrease of the force flux: at a point B distant by $r$ from the body A generating a force, this one is proportional to the field flux going through an elementary surface S perpendicular to the line AB. As the flux spreads uniformly through space, it decreases according to the solid angle sustaining the surface S. In the modern view of quantum field theory, the $1/r^2$ comes from the expression in position space of the propagator of the force carriers. For relatively weakly-interacting bodies, as is generally the case in electromagnetism or gravity or the nuclear interactions at short distances, the exchange of a single force carrier is a good first approximation of the interaction between the bodies, and classically the interaction will obey a $1/r^2$-law (note that if the force carrier is massive, there is an additional $r$ dependence). When the interactions are more intense (e.g. the charges or masses are larger, or $r$ is smaller) or happens over briefer time spans (smaller $r$), more force carriers are involved or particle pairs are created, see Fig. 1, resulting in the break-down of the $1/r^2$ behavior. The classical equivalent is that the field flux does not propagate freely in space any more but e.g. undergoes screening from the charges of the extra virtual particles, or interactions between these virtual particles. It is convenient to separate the first-order $1/r^2$ law from this extra $r$-dependence. This latter is then accounted for by being included in the coupling, which then becomes $1/r$-dependent, (or equivalently μ-dependent). Since the additional particles involved beyond the single force carrier approximation are always virtual, i.e. transient quantum field fluctuations, one understands why the running of a coupling is a genuine quantum and relativistic phenomenon, namely an effect of the high-order Feynman diagrams on the strength of the force.

Since a running coupling effectively accounts for microscopic quantum effects, it is often called an effective coupling, in contrast to the bare coupling (constant) present in the Lagrangian or Hamiltonian.

=== Beta functions ===
In quantum field theory, a beta function, β(g), encodes the running of a coupling parameter, g. It is defined by the relation

$$\beta(g) = \mu\frac{\partial g}{\partial \mu} = \frac{\partial g}{\partial \ln \mu},$$

where μ is the energy scale of the given physical process. If the beta functions of a quantum field theory vanish, then the theory is scale-invariant.

The coupling parameters of a quantum field theory can flow even if the corresponding classical field theory is scale-invariant. In this case, the non-zero beta function tells us that the classical scale-invariance is anomalous.

=== QED and the Landau pole ===
If a beta function is positive, the corresponding coupling increases with increasing energy. An example is quantum electrodynamics (QED), where one finds by using perturbation theory that the beta function is positive. In particular, at low energies, α ≈ 1/137, whereas at the scale of the Z boson, about 90 GeV, one measures α ≈ 1/127.

Moreover, the perturbative beta function tells us that the coupling continues to increase, and QED becomes strongly coupled at high energy. In fact the coupling apparently becomes infinite at some finite energy. This phenomenon was first noted by Lev Landau, and is called the Landau pole. However, one cannot expect the perturbative beta function to give accurate results at strong coupling, and so it is likely that the Landau pole is an artifact of applying perturbation theory in a situation where it is no longer valid. The true scaling behaviour of $\alpha$ at large energies is not known.

=== QCD and asymptotic freedom ===
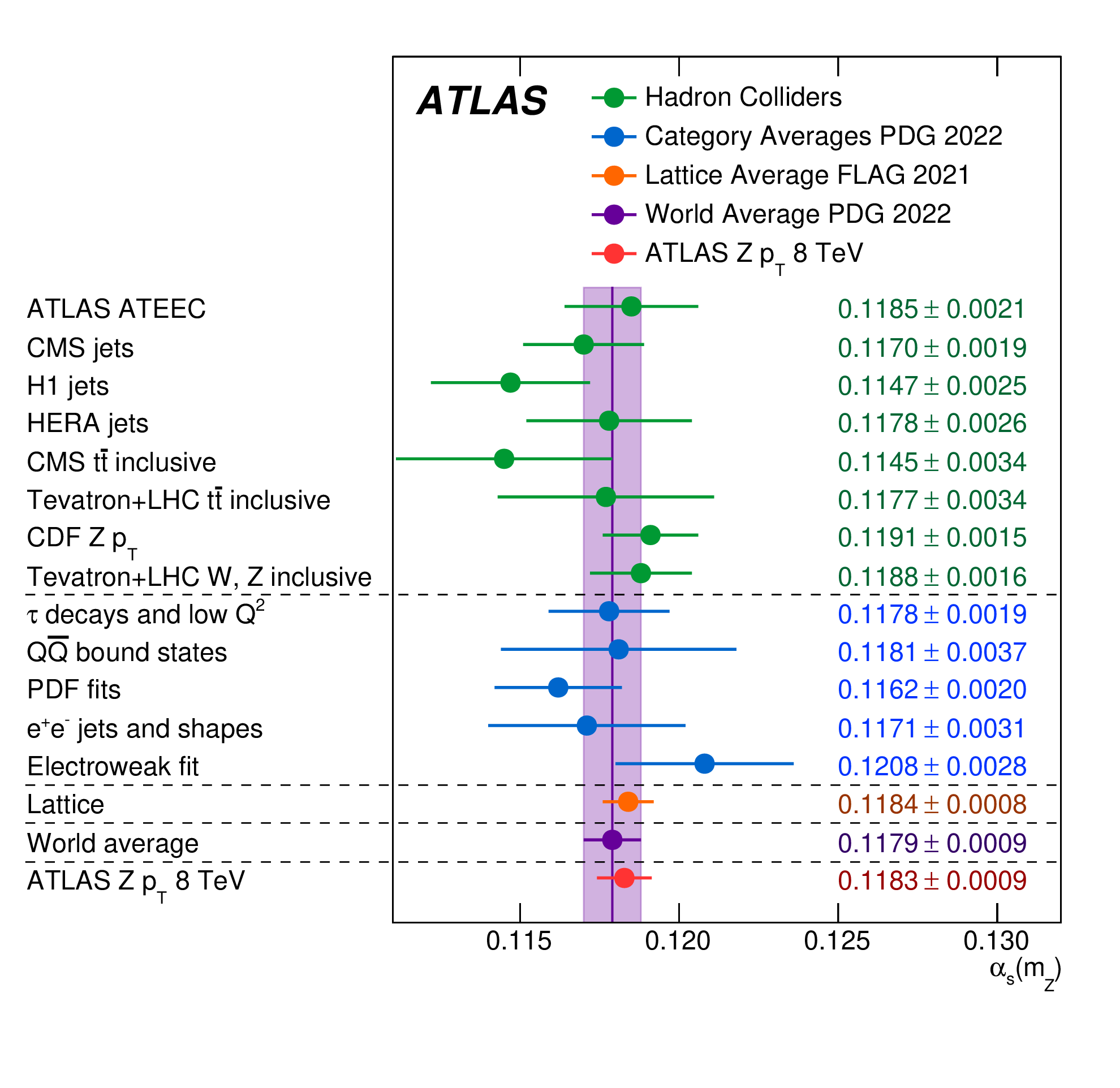
Comparison of the strong coupling constant measurements by different experiments as of 2023 with ATLAS the latest and most precise value

In non-abelian gauge theories, the beta function can be negative, as first found by Frank Wilczek, David Politzer and David Gross. An example of this is the beta function for quantum chromodynamics (QCD), and as a result the QCD coupling decreases at high energies.

Furthermore, the coupling decreases logarithmically, a phenomenon known as asymptotic freedom (the discovery of which was awarded with the Nobel Prize in Physics in 2004). The coupling decreases approximately as

$$\alpha_\text{s}(k^2) \ \stackrel{\mathrm{def}}{=}\  \frac{g_\text{s}^2(k^2)}{4\pi} \approx \frac1{\beta_0\ln\left({k^2}/{\Lambda^2}\right)},$$

where $k$ is the energy of the process involved and β_{0} is a constant first computed by Wilczek, Gross and Politzer.

Conversely, the coupling increases with decreasing energy. This means that the coupling becomes large at low energies, and one can no longer rely on perturbation theory. Hence, the actual value of the coupling constant is only defined at a given energy scale. In QCD, the Z boson mass scale is typically chosen, providing a value of the strong coupling constant of α_{s}(M_{Z}^{2} ) = 0.1179 ± 0.0010. In 2023 Atlas measured α_{s}(M_{Z}^{2}) = 0.1183 ± 0.0009 the most precise so far. The most precise measurements stem from lattice QCD calculations, studies of tau-lepton decay, as well as by the reinterpretation of the transverse momentum spectrum of the Z boson.

=== QCD scale ===
In quantum chromodynamics (QCD), the quantity Λ is called the QCD scale. The value is $\Lambda_{\rm MS} = 332\pm17\text{ MeV}$ for three "active" quark flavors, viz when the energy–momentum involved in the process allows production of only the up, down and strange quarks, but not the heavier quarks. This corresponds to energies below 1.275 GeV. At higher energy, Λ is smaller, e.g. $\Lambda_{\rm MS} = 210\pm14$ MeV above the bottom quark mass of about 5 GeV. The meaning of the minimal subtraction (MS) scheme scale Λ_{MS} is given in the article on dimensional transmutation. The proton-to-electron mass ratio is primarily determined by the QCD scale.

== String theory ==
A remarkably different situation exists in string theory since it includes a dilaton. An analysis of the string spectrum shows that this field must be present, either in the bosonic string or the NS–NS sector of the superstring. Using vertex operators, it can be seen that exciting this field is equivalent to adding a term to the action where a scalar field couples to the Ricci scalar. This field is therefore an entire function worth of coupling constants. These coupling constants are not pre-determined, adjustable, or universal parameters; they depend on space and time in a way that is determined dynamically. Sources that describe the string coupling as if it were fixed are usually referring to the vacuum expectation value. This is free to have any value in the bosonic theory where there is no superpotential.

== See also ==
- Canonical quantization, renormalization and dimensional regularization
- Quantum field theory, especially quantum electrodynamics and quantum chromodynamics
- Gluon field, Gluon field strength tensor
