= Beta function (physics) =

Function that encodes the dependence of a coupling parameter on the energy scale

In theoretical physics, specifically quantum field theory, a beta function or Gell-Mann–Low function, β(g), encodes the dependence of a coupling parameter, g, on the energy scale, μ, of a given physical process described by quantum field theory. It is defined by the Gell-Mann–Low equation or renormalization group equation, given by

$$\beta(g) = \mu \frac{\partial g}{\partial \mu} = \frac{\partial g}{\partial \ln(\mu)} ~,$$

and, because of the underlying renormalization group, it has no explicit dependence on μ, so it only depends on μ implicitly through g. This dependence on the energy scale thus specified is known as the running of the coupling parameter, a fundamental feature of scale-dependence in quantum field theory, and its explicit computation is achievable through a variety of mathematical techniques. The concept of beta function was first introduced by Ernst Stueckelberg and André Petermann in 1953, and independently postulated by Murray Gell-Mann and Francis E. Low in 1954.

== History ==
Murray Gell-Mann and Francis E. Low restricted the idea to scale transformations in QED in 1954, which are the most physically significant, and focused on asymptotic forms of the photon propagator at high energies. They determined the variation of the electromagnetic coupling in QED, by appreciating the simplicity of the scaling structure of that theory. They thus discovered that the coupling parameter g(μ) at the energy scale μ is effectively given by the (one-dimensional translation) group equation
$$g(\mu)=G^{-1}\left(\left(\frac{\mu}{M}\right)^d G(g(M))\right)$$
or equivalently, $G\left(g(\mu)\right)= G(g(M))\left({\mu}/{M}\right)^d$, for an arbitrary function G (known as Wegner's scaling function, after Franz Wegner) and a constant d, in terms of the coupling g(M) at a reference scale M.

Gell-Mann and Low realized in these results that the effective scale can be arbitrarily taken as μ, and can vary to define the theory at any other scale:
$$g(\kappa)=G^{-1}\left(\left(\frac{\kappa}{\mu}\right)^d G(g(\mu))\right) = G^{-1}\left(\left(\frac{\kappa}{M}\right)^d G(g(M))\right)$$

The gist of the RG is this group property: as the scale μ varies, the theory presents a self-similar replica of itself, and any scale can be accessed similarly from any other scale, by group action, a formal transitive conjugacy of couplings in the mathematical sense (Schröder's equation).

On the basis of this (finite) group equation and its scaling property, Gell-Mann and Low could then focus on infinitesimal transformations, and invented a computational method based on a mathematical flow function ψ(g) = G d/(∂G/∂g) of the coupling parameter g, which they introduced. Like the function h(e) of Stueckelberg–Petermann, their function determines the differential change of the coupling g(μ) with respect to a small change in energy scale μ through a differential equation, the renormalization group equation:
$$\displaystyle\frac{\partial g}{\partial \ln\mu} = \psi(g) = \beta(g)$$

The modern name is also indicated, the beta function, introduced by Curtis Callan and Kurt Symanzik in 1970. Since it is a mere function of g, integration in g of a perturbative estimate of it permits specification of the renormalization trajectory of the coupling, that is, its variation with energy, effectively the function G in this perturbative approximation. The renormalization group prediction (cf. Stueckelberg–Petermann and Gell-Mann–Low works) was confirmed 40 years later at the Large Electron–Positron Collider (LEP) experiments: the fine structure "constant" of QED was measured to be about 1/127 at energies close to 200 GeV, as opposed to the standard low-energy physics value of 1/137. (Note: Early applications to quantum electrodynamics are discussed in the influential 1959 book The Theory of Quantized Fields by Nikolay Bogolyubov and Dmitry Shirkov.)

== Scale invariance ==
If the beta functions of a quantum field theory (QFT) vanish, usually at particular values of the coupling parameters, then the theory is said to be scale-invariant. Almost all scale-invariant QFTs are also conformally invariant. The study of such theories is conformal field theory.

The coupling parameters of a quantum field theory can run even if the corresponding classical field theory is scale-invariant. In this case, the non-zero beta function tells us that the classical scale invariance is anomalous.

== Examples ==
Beta functions are usually computed in some kind of approximation scheme. An example is perturbation theory, where one assumes that the coupling parameters are small. One can then make an expansion in powers of the coupling parameters and truncate the higher-order terms (also known as higher loop contributions, due to the number of loops in the corresponding Feynman graphs).

Here are some examples of beta functions computed in perturbation theory:

=== Quantum electrodynamics ===
The one-loop beta function in quantum electrodynamics (QED) is

- $\beta(e)=\frac{e^3}{12\pi^2}~,$

or, equivalently,

- $\beta(\alpha)=\frac{2\alpha^2}{3\pi}~,$

written in terms of the fine structure constant in natural units, α = e^{2}/4π.

This beta function tells us that the coupling increases with increasing energy scale, and QED becomes strongly coupled at high energy. In fact, the coupling apparently becomes infinite at some finite energy, resulting in a Landau pole. However, one cannot expect the perturbative beta function to give accurate results at strong coupling, and so it is likely that the Landau pole is an artifact of applying perturbation theory in a situation where it is no longer valid.

=== Quantum chromodynamics ===
The one-loop beta function in quantum chromodynamics with $n_f$ flavours and $n_s$ scalar colored bosons is

$$\beta(g)=-\left(11- \frac{n_s}{6} - \frac{2n_f}{3}\right)\frac{g^3}{16\pi^2}~,$$

or

$$\beta(\alpha_s)=-\left(11- \frac{n_s}{6}-\frac{2n_f}{3}\right)\frac{\alpha_s^2}{2\pi}~,$$

written in terms of α_{s} = $g^2/4\pi$ .

Assuming n_{s}=0, if n_{f} ≤ 16, the ensuing beta function dictates that the coupling decreases with increasing energy scale, a phenomenon known as asymptotic freedom. Conversely, the coupling increases with decreasing energy scale. This means that the coupling becomes large at low energies, and one can no longer rely on perturbation theory.

=== SU(N) Non-Abelian gauge theory ===
While the (Yang–Mills) gauge group of QCD is $\mathrm{SU}(3)$, and determines 3 colors, we can generalize to any number of colors, $N_c$, with a gauge group $G=\mathrm{SU}(N_c)$. Then for this gauge group, with Dirac fermions in a representation $R_f$ of $G$ and with complex scalars in a representation $R_s$, the one-loop beta function is

$$\beta(g)=-\left(\frac{11}{3}C_2(G)-\frac{1}{3}n_sT(R_s)-\frac{4}{3}n_f T(R_f)\right)\frac{g^3}{16\pi^2}~,$$

where $C_2(G)$ is the quadratic Casimir of $G$ and $T(R)$ is another Casimir invariant defined by $Tr (T^a_RT^b_R) = T(R)\delta^{ab}$ for generators $T^{a,b}_R$ of the Lie algebra in the representation R. (For Weyl or Majorana fermions, replace $4/3$ by $2/3$, and for real scalars, replace $1/3$ by $1/6$.) For gauge fields (i.e. gluons), necessarily in the adjoint of $G$, $C_2(G) = N_c$; for fermions in the fundamental (or anti-fundamental) representation of $G$, $T(R) = 1/2$. Then for QCD, with $N_c = 3$, the above equation reduces to that listed for the quantum chromodynamics beta function.

This famous result was derived nearly simultaneously in 1973 by Hugh David Politzer, David Gross and Frank Wilczek, for which the three were awarded the Nobel Prize in Physics in 2004. Unbeknownst to these authors, Gerard 't Hooft had announced the result in a comment following a talk by Kurt Symanzik at a small meeting in Marseille in June 1972, but he never published it.

=== Standard Model Higgs–Yukawa couplings ===
In the Standard Model, quarks and leptons have Yukawa couplings to the Higgs boson. These determine the mass of the particle. Most all of the quarks' and leptons' Yukawa couplings are small compared to the top quark's Yukawa coupling. These Yukawa couplings change their values depending on the energy scale at which they are measured, through running. The dynamics of Yukawa couplings of quarks are determined by the renormalization group equation:

$\mu \frac{\partial}{\partial\mu} y \approx \frac{y}{16\pi^2}\left(\frac{9}{2}y^2 - 8 g_3^2\right)$,

where $g_3$ is the color gauge coupling (which is a function of $\mu$ and associated with asymptotic freedom) and $y$ is the Yukawa coupling. This equation describes how the Yukawa coupling changes with energy scale $\mu$.

The Yukawa couplings of the up, down, charm, strange and bottom quarks, are small at the extremely high energy scale of grand unification, $\mu \approx 10^{15}$ GeV. Therefore, the $y^2$ term can be neglected in the above equation. Solving, we then find that $y$ is increased slightly at the low energy scales at which the quark masses are generated by the Higgs, $\mu \approx 100$ GeV.

On the other hand, solutions to this equation for large initial values $y$ cause the rhs to quickly approach smaller values as we descend in energy scale. The above equation then locks $y$ to the QCD coupling $g_3$. This is known as the (infrared) quasi-fixed point of the renormalization group equation for the Yukawa coupling. No matter what the initial starting value of the coupling is, if it is sufficiently large it will reach this quasi-fixed point value, and the corresponding quark mass is predicted.

=== Minimal supersymmetric Standard Model ===
Renomalization group studies in the minimal supersymmetric Standard Model (MSSM) of grand unification and the Higgs–Yukawa fixed points were very encouraging that the theory was on the right track. So far, however, no evidence of the predicted MSSM particles has emerged in experiment at the Large Hadron Collider.

== See also ==
- Banks–Zaks fixed point
- Callan–Symanzik equation
- Quantum triviality
