= Reinhard Oehme =

German-American physicist

- Born: January 28, 1928; Wiesbaden, Germany
- Died: October 4, 2010 (aged 82); Chicago, United States
- Citizenship: American
- Education: Rheingau Gymnasium Geisenheim (Abitur)
- Alma mater: Goethe University Frankfurt (Diploma); University of Göttingen (Dr.rer.nat.)
- Known for: CP violation Edge-of-the-wedge theorem
- Spouse: Mafalda Pisani (died 2004)
- Awards: Humboldt Award (1974); Guggenheim Fellowship (1964)
- Scientific career
- Fields: Physics
- Institutions: Enrico Fermi Institute
- Thesis: Erzeugung von Photonen beim Zusammenstoß von Nukleonen (1951)
- Doctoral advisor: Werner Heisenberg
- Other academic advisors: Erwin Madelung (diploma)

Reinhard Oehme (German: [ˈøːmə]; born 26 January 1928, Wiesbaden; died sometime between 29 September and 4 October 2010, Hyde Park) was a German-American physicist known for the discovery of C (charge conjugation) non-conservation in the presence of P (parity) violation, the formulation and proof of hadron dispersion relations, the edge-of-the-wedge theorem in the function theory of several complex variables, the Goldberger–Miyazawa–Oehme sum rule, reduction of quantum field theories, Oehme–Zimmermann superconvergence relations for gauge field correlation functions, and many other contributions.

Oehme was born in Wiesbaden, Germany as the son of Dr. Reinhold Oehme and Katharina Kraus. In 1952, in São Paulo, Brazil, he married Mafalda Pisani, who was born in Berlin as the daughter of Giacopo Pisani and Wanda d'Alfonso. Mafalda died in Chicago in August of the year 2004.

== Education and career ==
Completing the Abitur at the Rheingau Gymnasium in Geisenheim near Wiesbaden, Oehme started to study physics and mathematics at the Goethe University Frankfurt, receiving the Diploma in 1948 as student of Erwin Madelung. Then he moved to Göttingen, joining the Max Planck Institute for Physics as a doctoral student of Werner Heisenberg, who was also a professor at the University of Göttingen. Early in 1951, Oehme completed the requirements for his Dr.rer.nat. at the University of Göttingen. The translation of the title of his thesis is: "Creation of Photons in Collisions of Nucleons” Later this year, Heisenberg asked him to join Carl Friedrich von Weizsäcker on a trip to Brazil for the start-up of the Instituto de Física Teórica in São Paulo, considered also as a possible escape in view of the tense situation in Europe. In 1953, he returned to his assistant position at the Max Planck Institute in Göttingen. During the early fifties, the institute was a most interesting place. Oehme was there among an exceptional group of people around Heisenberg, including Vladimir Glaser, Rolf Hagedorn, Fritz Houtermans, Gerhart Lüders, Walter Thirring, Kurt Symanzik, Carl Friedrich von Weizsaecker, Wolfhart Zimmermann, Bruno Zumino, who all have made important contributions to physics at some time. A year later, with Heisenberg's recommendation to his friend Enrico Fermi, Oehme was offered a research associate position at the University of Chicago, where he worked at the Institute for Nuclear Studies. Publications associated with this period are described below under Work. In the fall of 1956, he moved to Princeton as a member of the Institute for Advanced Study, returning in 1958 to the University of Chicago as a professor in the department of physics and at the Enrico Fermi Institute for Nuclear Studies. In 1998, he became professor emeritus.

=== Visiting professor positions (Note: For citations see corresponding publications and acknowledgements in publications.) ===
University of Maryland, College Park, 1957; University of Vienna, Austria ,1961; Imperial College London, 1963-64; University of Karlsruhe (TH), Germany, 1974, 1975, 1977; University of Tokyo, Japan, 1976, 1988; Research Institute of Fundamental Physics, Kyoto University, Japan, 1976.

=== Visiting positions ===
Instituto de Física Teórica, São Paulo, Brasil; Brookhaven National Laboratory; Lawrence Berkeley National Laboratory; CERN, Geneva, Switzerland; International Centre for Theoretical Physics, Miramare-Trieste, Italy; Max Planck Institute for Physics, Munich, Germany.

=== Awards ===
Guggenheim Fellow, 1963–64; Humboldt Price, 1974; Fellowship of the Japanese Society for the Promotion of Science (JSPS) 1976, 1988.

=== Honors ===
The University of Chicago offers annually the Enrico Fermi, Robert R. McCormick & Mafalda and Reinhard Oehme Postdoctoral Research Fellowships.

== Work ==
=== Dispersion relations, GMO sum rule, and edge-of-the-wedge theorem ===
In 1954 in Chicago, Oehme studied the analytic properties of forward scattering amplitudes in quantum field theories. He found that particle-particle and antiparticle-particle amplitudes are connected by analytic continuation in the complex energy plane. These results led to the paper by him with Marvin L. Goldberger and Hironari Miyazawa on the dispersion relations for pion-nucleon scattering, which also contains the Goldberger–Miyazawa–Oehme sum rule. There is good agreement with the experimental results of the Fermi Group at Chicago, the Lindenbaum Group at Brookhaven and others. The GMO sum rule is often used in the analysis of the pion-nucleon system. Oehme published a proper derivation of hadronic forward dispersion relations on the basis of local quantum field theory in an article published in Il Nuovo Cimento. His proof remains valid in gauge theories with confinement. The analytic connection Oehme found between particle and antiparticle amplitudes is the first example of a fundamental feature of local quantum field theory: the crossing property. It is proven here, in a non-perturbative setting, on the basis of the analytic properties of amplitudes which are a consequence of locality and spectrum, like the dispersion relations. For generalizations, one still relies mostly on perturbation theory. For the purpose of using the powerful methods of the theory of functions of several complex variables for the proof of non-forward dispersion relations, and for analytic properties of other Green's functions, Oehme formulated and proved a fundamental theorem which he called the edge-of-the-wedge theorem (Keilkanten Theorem). This work was done mainly in the fall of 1956 at the Institute for Advanced Study in collaboration with Hans-Joachim Bremermann and John G. Taylor. Using microscopic causality and spectral properties, the Bremermann–Oehme–Taylor (BOT) theorem provides an initial region of analyticity, which can be enlarged by analytic completion. Oehme first presented these results at the Princeton University Colloquium during the winter semester 1956/57. Independently, a different and elaborate proof of non-forward dispersion relations has been published by Nikolay Bogoliubov and collaborators. The edge-of-the-wedge theorem by BOT has many other applications. For example, it can be used to show that, in the presence of (spontaneous) violations of Lorentz invariance, micro-causality (locality), together with positivity of the energy, implies Lorentz invariance of the energy- momentum spectrum. Together with Marvin L. Goldberger and Yoichiro Nambu, Oehme also has formulated dispersion relations for nucleon-nucleon scattering.

=== Charge conjugation non-conservation ===
On August 7, 1956, Oehme wrote a letter to C.N. Yang in which it is shown that weak interactions must violate charge conjugation conservation in the event of a positive outcome of the polarization experiment in beta-decay. Since parity conservation leads to the same restrictions, he points out that C and P must BOTH be violated in order to get an asymmetry. Hence, at the level of ordinary weak interactions, CP is the relevant symmetry, and not C and P individually. Violation of C is one of the fundamental conditions for the matter-antimatter asymmetry of the Universe. The results of Oehme form the basis for the later experimental effort to study CP Symmetry, and the fundamental discovery of non-conservation at a lower level of interaction strength. As indicated above, the letter is reprinted in the book on Selected Papers by C.N. Yang. Prompted by the letter, T.D. Lee, R Oehme and C.N. Yang provided a detailed discussion of the interplay of non-invariance under P, C and T, and of applications to the kaon - anti-kaon complex. Their results are of importance for the description of the CP violation discovered later. In their paper the authors already consider non-invariance under T (time reversal) and hence, given the assumption of CPT symmetry, also under CP.

=== Propagators and OZ superconvergence relations ===
In connection with an exact structure analysis for gauge theory propagators, undertaken by Oehme in collaboration with Wolfhart Zimmermann, he obtained superconvergence relations for theories where the number of matter fields (flavors) is below a given limit. These Oehme–Zimmernann relations provide a link between long- and short-distance properties of the theory. They are of importance for gluon confinement. These results about propagators depend essentially only upon general principles.

=== Reduction of quantum field theories ===
As a general method of imposing restrictions on quantum field theories with several parameters, Oehme and Zimmermann have introduced a theory of reduction of coupling constants. This method is based upon the renormalization group, and is more general than the imposition of symmetries. There are solutions of the reduction equations which do not correspond to additional symmetries, but may be related to other characteristic aspects of the theory. On the other hand, supersymmetric theories do come out as possible solutions. This is an important example for the appearance of supersymmetry without imposing it explicitly. The reduction theory is finding many applications, theoretical and phenomenological.

=== Other contributions ===
Further contributions by Oehme, like those involving complex angular momentum, Rising cross sections, broken symmetries, current algebras and weak interactions, as well as chapters in books.
