= Rolf Hagedorn =

German theoretical physicist

- Rolf Hagedorn, 1981
- Born: 20 July 1919; Barmen
- Died: 9 March 2003 (aged 83); Geneva
- Education: University of Göttingen
- Known for: Hagedorn temperature, statistical bootstrap model, self-consistency principle in high energy physics
- Scientific career
- Fields: Theoretical particle physics, Statistical physics
- Workplaces: Max Planck Institute for Physics, CERN
- Doctoral advisor: Richard Becker

Rolf Hagedorn (20 July 1919 – 9 March 2003) was a German theoretical physicist who worked at CERN. He is known for the idea that hadronic matter has a "melting point". The Hagedorn temperature is named in his honor.

== Early life ==
Hagedorn's younger life was deeply marked by the upheavals of World War II in Europe. He graduated from high school in 1937 and was drafted into the German Army. After the war began, he was shipped off into North Africa as an officer in the Rommel Afrika Korps. He was captured in 1943, and spent the rest of the war in an officer prison camp in the United States. Most of the prisoners were young and with nothing to do, Hagedorn and others set up their own 'university' where they taught each other whatever they knew. There, Hagedorn ran into an assistant of David Hilbert, who taught him mathematics.

== Becoming a physicist ==
When Hagedorn came back home in January 1946, most German universities were destroyed. Because of his training in the Crossville, Tennessee prison camp, he was accepted as a fourth-semester student at the University of Göttingen – one of the few remaining universities.

After having completed his studies with the usual diploma (1950) and doctorate (1952), with a thesis under Prof. Richhard Becker on thermal solid-state theory, he was accepted as a postdoc at the Max Planck Institute for Physics (MPI), still at Göttingen at the time. While he was there, he was among a group of physicists including Bruno Zumino, Harry Lehmann, Wolfhart Zimmermann, Kurt Symanzik, Gerhart Lüders, Reinhard Oehme, Vladimir Glaser, and Carl Friedrich von Weizsäcker.

== Life at CERN ==
In 1954—following a recommendation from Werner Heisenberg who was director at MPI at the time—Hagedorn took up an appointment at CERN in Geneva, Switzerland. The new laboratory was about to be established. The pioneering work on linear orbit theory had just been completed by Gerhard Lüders, who wished to go back to Göttingen. In the initial years, Hagedorn helped with particle accelerator designs, particularly to calculate non-linear oscillations in particle orbits.

When the CERN theory group came to Geneva from Copenhagen in 1957, where it had been located at first, Hagedorn joined the group. Hagedorn brought to the Theory Division an unusual interdisciplinary background which included particle and nuclear as well as thermal, solid state and accelerator physics. Once member of the Theory Division, he exclusively focused on the statistical models of particle production.

== Particle production work ==
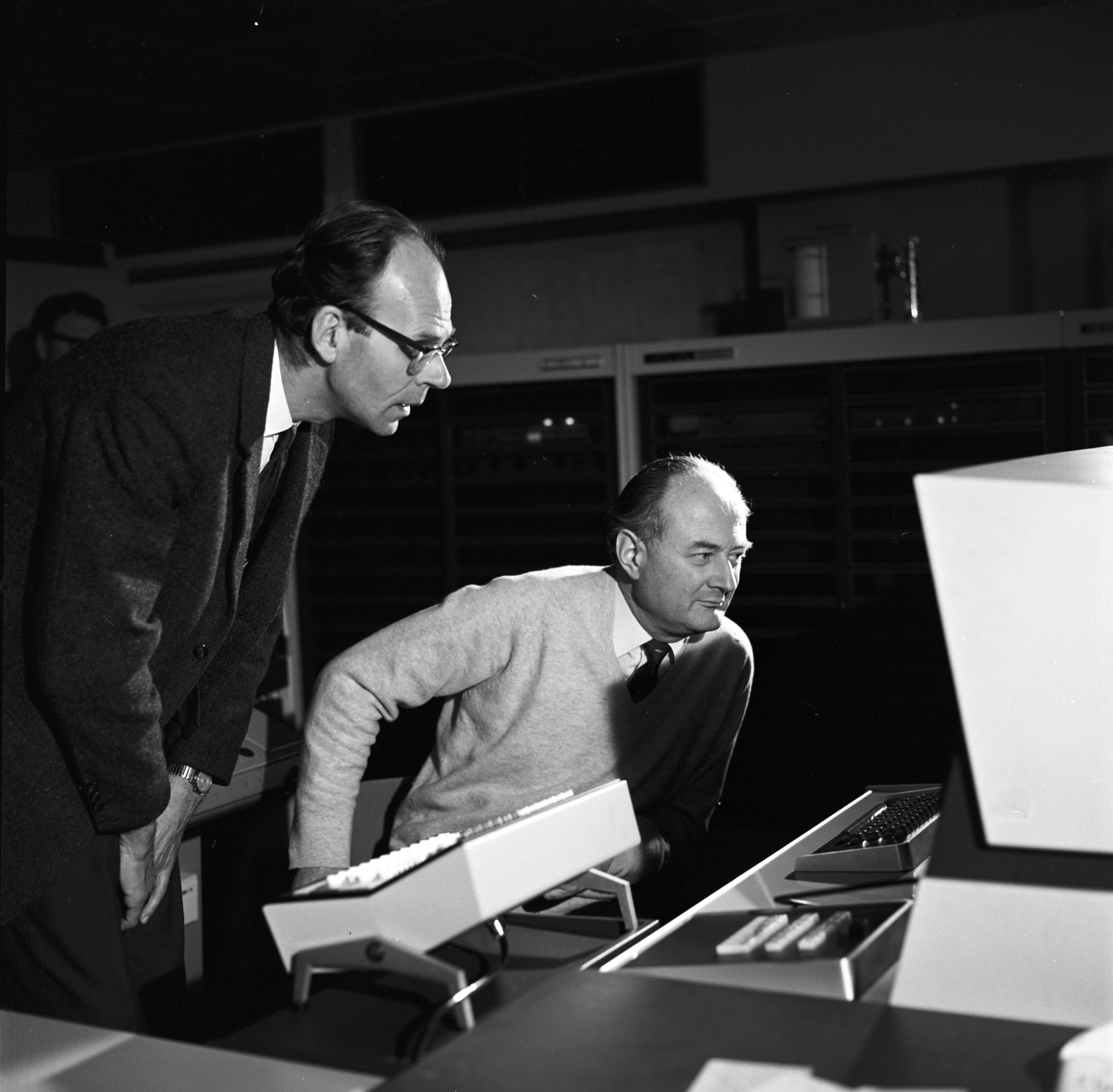
Léon Van Hove and Rolf Hagedorn watching results on a computer terminal at CERN, 1968.

Hagedorn's work started when Bruno Ferretti (then-head of the Theory Division), asked him to try to predict particle yields in the high energy collisions of the time. He started with Frans Cerulus. There were few clues to begin with but they made the best of the "fireball concept" which was then supported by cosmic ray studies and used it to make predictions about particle yields (and therefore the secondary beams to be expected from the main beam directed at a target). As a result of his investigations the self-consistency principle was developed.

Many key ingredients brought soon afterward by experiment helped refine the approach. Among them is the limited transverse momentum with which the overwhelming majority of the secondary particles happen to be produced. They show an exponential drop with respect to the transverse mass. There is also the exponential drop of elastic scattering at wide angles as a function of incident energy. Such exponential behaviors strongly suggested a thermal distribution for whatever eventually comes out of the reaction. Based on this, Hagedorn put forth his thermal interpretation and used it to build production models which turned out to be remarkably accurate at predicting yields for the many different types of secondary particles. Many objections were raised at the time, particularly as to what could actually be 'thermalized' in the collisions, applying straightforward statistical mechanics to the produced pions gave the wrong results, and the temperature of the system was apparently constant when it should have risen with the incident energy or with the mass of the excited fireball (according to Boltzmann's Law).

For collision energies above approximately 10 GeV, the naive statistical model needed improvement.

== Hagedorn temperature and the statistical bootstrap model (SBM) ==
Seeing the experimental results, Hagedorn invented a new theoretical framework called statistical bootstrap model (SBM).

The SBM model of strong interactions is based on the observation that hadrons are made of hadrons in an infinite chain. This leads to the concept of a sequence of heavier and heavier particles, each being a possible constituent of a still heavier one, while at the same time being itself composed of lighter particles. In this SBM framework there would be ever increasing particle production at the Hagedorn temperature. Hagedorn gave this extensive summary of the historical path across 50 years of research in particle physics at his last 2-hours public lecture in Divonne 1994, which was recorded and later made available online. Hagedorn interpreted this limiting temperature, visible at that time also in the transverse mass distribution of the secondary particles, in terms of the slope of an exponential spectrum of all strongly interacting particles appearing in the SBM; the value is of the order of ~150–160 MeV. Later work allowed the interpretation of the Hagedorn temperature as the temperature at which hadrons melt into a new phase of matter, the quark–gluon plasma.

== Awards and legacy ==
An honorary book (or festschrift) was written by professor Johann Rafelski in 2016 as a tribute to Hagedorn. The book includes contributions by contemporaneous friends and colleagues of Hagedorn: Tamás Biró, Igor Dremin, Torleif Ericson, Marek Gaździcki, Mark Gorenstein, Hans Gutbrod, Maurice Jacob, István Montvay, Berndt Müller, Grazyna Odyniec, Emanuele Quercigh, Krzysztof Redlich, Helmut Satz, Luigi Sertorio, Ludwik Turko, and Gabriele Veneziano.
