= Regularization (physics) =

Method used in mathematical physics

In physics, especially quantum field theory, regularization is a method of modifying observables which have singularities in order to make them finite by the introduction of a suitable parameter called the regulator. The regulator, also known as a "cutoff", models our lack of knowledge about physics at unobserved scales (e.g. scales of small size or large energy levels). It compensates for (and requires) the possibility of separation of scales that "new physics" may be discovered at those scales which the present theory is unable to model, while enabling the current theory to give accurate predictions as an "effective theory" within its intended scale of use.

It is distinct from renormalization, another technique to control infinities without assuming new physics, by adjusting for self-interaction feedback.

Regularization was for many decades controversial even amongst its inventors, as it combines physical and epistemological claims into the same equations. However, it is now well understood and has proven to yield useful, accurate predictions.

== Overview ==
Regularization procedures deal with infinite, divergent, and nonsensical expressions by introducing the auxiliary concept of a regulator (for example, the minimal distance $\epsilon$ in space, which is useful if the divergences arise from short-distance physical effects). The correct physical result is obtained in the limit in which the regulator goes away (in our example, $\epsilon\to 0$), but the virtue of the regulator is that for its finite value, the result is finite.

However, the result usually includes terms proportional to expressions like $1/ \epsilon$ which are not well-defined in the limit $\epsilon\to 0$. Regularization is the first step towards obtaining a completely finite and meaningful result; in quantum field theory it must be usually followed by a related, but independent technique called renormalization. Renormalization is based on the requirement that some physical quantities — expressed by seemingly divergent expressions such as $1/ \epsilon$ — are equal to the observed values. Such a constraint allows one to calculate a finite value for many other quantities that looked divergent.

The existence of a limit as ε goes to zero and the independence of the final result from the regulator are nontrivial facts. The underlying reason for them lies in universality as shown by Kenneth G. Wilson and Leo Kadanoff and the existence of a second order phase transition. Sometimes, taking the limit as ε goes to zero is not possible. As is the case of the Landau pole and for nonrenormalizable couplings like the Fermi interaction. However, even for these two examples, if the regulator only gives reasonable results for $\epsilon \gg \hbar c/\Lambda$ (where $\Lambda$ is a superior energy cuttoff) and we are working with scales of the order of $\hbar c/\Lambda'$, regulators with $\hbar c/\Lambda \ll \epsilon \ll \hbar c/\Lambda'$ still give pretty accurate approximations. The physical reason why we can't take the limit of ε going to zero is the existence of new physics below Λ.

It is not always possible to define a regularization such that the limit of ε going to zero is independent of the regularization. In this case, one says that the theory contains an anomaly. Anomalous theories have been studied in great detail and are often founded on the celebrated Atiyah–Singer index theorem or variations thereof (see, for example, the chiral anomaly).

== Classical physics example ==
The problem of infinities first arose in the classical electrodynamics of point particles in the 19th and early 20th century.

The mass of a charged particle should include the mass–energy in its electrostatic field (electromagnetic mass). Assume that the particle is a charged spherical shell of radius r_{e}. The mass–energy in the field is

$$m_\mathrm{em} = \int {1\over 2}E^2 \, dV = \int_{r_e}^{\infty} \frac{1}{2} \left( {q\over 4\pi r^2} \right)^2 4\pi r^2 \, dr = {q^2 \over 8\pi r_e},$$

which becomes infinite as r_{e} → 0. This implies that the point particle would have infinite inertia, making it unable to be accelerated. Incidentally, the value of r_{e} that makes $m_{\mathrm{em}}$ equal to the electron mass is called the classical electron radius, which (setting $q = e$ and restoring factors of c and $\varepsilon_0$) turns out to be

$$r_e = {e^2 \over 4\pi\varepsilon_0 m_{\mathrm{e}} c^2} = \alpha {\hbar\over m_{\mathrm{e}} c} \approx 2.8 \times 10^{-15}\ \mathrm{m}.$$

where $\alpha \approx 1/137.040$ is the fine-structure constant, and $\hbar/m_{\mathrm{e}} c$ is the Compton wavelength of the electron.

Regularization: Classical physics theory breaks down at small scales, e.g., the difference between an electron and a point particle shown above. Addressing this problem requires new kinds of additional physical constraints. For instance, in this case, assuming a finite electron radius (i.e., regularizing the electron mass-energy) suffices to explain the system below a certain size. Similar regularization arguments work in other renormalization problems. For example, a theory may hold under one narrow set of conditions, but due to calculations involving infinities or singularities, it may breakdown under other conditions or scales. In the case of the electron, another way to avoid infinite mass-energy while retaining the point nature of the particle is to postulate tiny additional dimensions over which the particle could 'spread out' rather than restrict its motion solely over 3D space. This is precisely the motivation behind string theory and other multi-dimensional models including multiple time dimensions. Rather than the existence of unknown new physics, assuming the existence of particle interactions with other surrounding particles in the environment, renormalization offers an alternative strategy to resolve infinities in such classical problems.

== Specific types ==
Specific types of regularization procedures include

- Causal regularization
- Dimensional regularization
- Hadamard regularization
- Lattice regularization
- Pauli–Villars regularization
- Zeldovich regularization
- Zeta function regularization

== Realistic regularization ==
=== Conceptual problem ===
Perturbative predictions by quantum field theory about quantum scattering of elementary particles, implied by a corresponding Lagrangian density, are computed using the Feynman rules. However, a regularization method is needed to circumvent ultraviolet divergences so as to obtain finite results for Feynman diagrams containing loops. Also a renormalization scheme is needed. Regularization results in regularized n-point Green's functions (propagators), and a suitable limiting procedure (a renormalization scheme) leading to perturbative S-matrix elements. These are independent of the particular regularization method used, and enable one to model perturbatively the measurable physical processes (cross sections, probability amplitudes, decay widths and lifetimes of excited states). However, so far no known regularized n-point Green's functions can be regarded as being based on a physically realistic theory of quantum-scattering since the derivation of each disregards some of the basic tenets of conventional physics (e.g., by not being Lorentz-invariant, by introducing either unphysical particles with a negative metric or wrong statistics, or discrete space-time, or lowering the dimensionality of space-time, or some combination thereof). So the available regularization methods are understood as formalistic technical devices, devoid of any direct physical meaning. In addition, there are qualms about renormalization. For a history and comments on this more than half-a-century old open conceptual problem, see e.g.

=== Pauli's conjecture ===
As it seems that the vertices of non-regularized Feynman series adequately describe interactions in quantum scattering, it is taken that their ultraviolet divergences are due to the asymptotic, high-energy behavior of the Feynman propagators. So it is a prudent, conservative approach to retain the vertices in Feynman series, and modify only the Feynman propagators to create a regularized Feynman series. This is the reasoning behind the formal Pauli–Villars covariant regularization by modification of Feynman propagators through auxiliary unphysical particles, cf. and representation of physical reality by Feynman diagrams.

In 1949 Wolfgang Pauli conjectured there is a realistic regularization, which is implied by a theory that respects all the established principles of contemporary physics. So its propagators (i) do not need to be regularized, and (ii) can be regarded as such a regularization of the propagators used in quantum field theories that might reflect the underlying physics. The additional parameters of such a theory do not need to be removed (i.e. the theory needs no renormalization) and may provide some new information about the physics of quantum scattering, though they may turn out experimentally to be negligible. By contrast, any present regularization method introduces formal coefficients that must eventually be disposed of by renormalization.

=== Opinions ===
Paul Dirac was persistently, extremely critical about procedures of renormalization. In 1963, he wrote, "… in the renormalization theory we have a theory that has defied all the attempts of the mathematician to make it sound. I am inclined to suspect that the renormalization theory is something that will not survive in the future,…" He further observed that "One can distinguish between two main procedures for a theoretical physicist. One of them is to work from the experimental basis ... The other procedure is to work from the mathematical basis. One examines and criticizes the existing theory. One tries to pin-point the faults in it and then tries to remove them. The difficulty here is to remove the faults without destroying the very great successes of the existing theory."

Abdus Salam remarked in 1972, "Field-theoretic infinities first encountered in Lorentz's computation of electron have persisted in classical electrodynamics for seventy and in quantum electrodynamics for some thirty-five years. These long years of frustration have left in the subject a curious affection for the infinities and a passionate belief that they are an inevitable part of nature; so much so that even the suggestion of a hope that they may after all be circumvented - and finite values for the renormalization constants computed - is considered irrational."

However, in Gerard ’t Hooft’s opinion, "History tells us that if we hit upon some obstacle, even if it looks like a pure formality or just a technical complication, it should be carefully scrutinized. Nature might be telling us something, and we should find out what it is."

The difficulty with a realistic regularization is that so far there is none, although nothing could be destroyed by its bottom-up approach; and there is no experimental basis for it.

=== Minimal realistic regularization ===
Considering distinct theoretical problems, Dirac in 1963 suggested: "I believe separate ideas will be needed to solve these distinct problems and that they will be solved one at a time through successive stages in the future evolution of physics. At this point I find myself in disagreement with most physicists. They are inclined to think one master idea will be discovered that will solve all these problems together. I think it is asking too much to hope that anyone will be able to solve all these problems together. One should separate them one from another as much as possible and try to tackle them separately. And I believe the future development of physics will consist of solving them one at a time, and that after any one of them has been solved there will still be a great mystery about how to attack further ones."

According to Dirac, "Quantum electrodynamics is the domain of physics that we know most about, and presumably it will have to be put in order before we can hope to make any fundamental progress with other field theories, although these will continue to develop on the experimental basis."

Dirac’s two preceding remarks suggest that we should start searching for a realistic regularization in the case of quantum electrodynamics (QED) in the four-dimensional Minkowski spacetime, starting with the original QED Lagrangian density.

The path-integral formulation provides the most direct way from the Lagrangian density to the corresponding Feynman series in its Lorentz-invariant form. The free-field part of the Lagrangian density determines the Feynman propagators, whereas the rest determines the vertices. As the QED vertices are considered to adequately describe interactions in QED scattering, it makes sense to modify only the free-field part of the Lagrangian density so as to obtain such regularized Feynman series that the LSZ reduction formula provides a perturbative S-matrix that: (i) is Lorentz-invariant and unitary; (ii) involves only the QED particles; (iii) depends solely on QED parameters and those introduced by the modification of the Feynman propagators—for particular values of these parameters it is equal to the QED perturbative S-matrix; and (iv) exhibits the same symmetries as the QED perturbative S-matrix. Let us refer to such a regularization as the minimal realistic regularization, and start searching for the corresponding, modified free-field parts of the QED Lagrangian density.

== Transport theoretic approach ==
According to James Bjorken and Sidney Drell (see ultraviolet divergence proliferation in perturbative theory), it would make physical sense to sidestep ultraviolet divergences by using more detailed description than can be provided by differential field equations. And Richard Feynman noted about the use of differential equations: "... for neutron diffusion it is only an approximation that is good when the distance over which we are looking is large compared with the mean free path. If we looked more closely, we would see individual neutrons running around." And then he wondered, "Could it be that the real world consists of little X-ons which can be seen only at very tiny distances? And that in our measurements we are always observing on such a large scale that we can’t see these little X-ons, and that is why we get the differential equations? ... Are they [therefore] also correct only as a smoothed-out imitation of a really much more complicated microscopic world?"

Already in 1938, Werner Heisenberg proposed that a quantum field theory can provide only an idealized, large-scale description of quantum dynamics, valid for distances larger than some fundamental length, expected also by Bjorken and Drell in 1965. Feynman's preceding remark provides a possible physical reason for its existence; either that or it is just another way of saying the same thing (there is a fundamental unit of distance) but having no new information.

== Hints at new physics ==
The need for regularization terms in any quantum field theory of quantum gravity is a major motivation for physics beyond the Standard Model. Infinities of the non-gravitational forces in QFT can be controlled via renormalization only but additional regularization - and hence new physics—is required uniquely for gravity. The regularizers model, and work around, the breakdown of QFT at small scales and thus show clearly the need for some other theory to come into play beyond QFT at these scales. Anthony Zee in Quantum Field Theory in a Nutshell considers this to be a benefit of the regularization framework—theories can work well in their intended domains but also contain information about their own limitations and point clearly to where new physics is needed.
