= High-dimensional Ising model =

Model in statistical physics

The Ising model is a prototypical model in statistical physics. The model consists of discrete variables that represent magnetic dipole moments of atomic "spins" that can be in one of two states (+1 or −1). The spins are arranged in a graph, usually a lattice (where the local structure repeats periodically in all directions), allowing each spin to interact with its neighbors. A model of this type can be defined on lattices in any number of dimensions. Techniques that are applicable for small dimensions are not always useful for larger dimensions, and vice versa.

In any dimension, the Ising model can be productively described by a locally varying mean field. The field is defined as the average spin value over a large region, but not so large so as to include the entire system. The field still has slow variations from point to point, as the averaging volume moves. These fluctuations in the field are described by a continuum field theory in the infinite system limit. The accuracy of this approximation improves as the dimension becomes larger. A deeper understanding of how the Ising model behaves, going beyond mean-field approximations, can be achieved using renormalization group methods.

== Local field ==
The field H is defined as the long wavelength Fourier components of the spin variable, in the limit that the wavelengths are long. There are many ways to take the long wavelength average, depending on the details of how high wavelengths are cut off. The details are not too important, since the goal is to find the statistics of H and not the spins. Once the correlations in H are known, the long-distance correlations between the spins will be proportional to the long-distance correlations in H.

For any value of the slowly varying field H, the free energy (log-probability) is a local analytic function of H and its gradients. The free energy F(H) is defined to be the sum over all Ising configurations which are consistent with the long wavelength field. Since H is a coarse description, there are many Ising configurations consistent with each value of H, so long as not too much exactness is required for the match.

Since the allowed range of values of the spin in any region only depends on the values of H within one averaging volume from that region, the free energy contribution from each region only depends on the value of H there and in the neighboring regions. So F is a sum over all regions of a local contribution, which only depends on H and its derivatives.

By symmetry in H, only even powers contribute. By reflection symmetry on a square lattice, only even powers of gradients contribute. Writing out the first few terms in the free energy:

$$\beta F  =  \int d^dx \left[ A H^2 + \sum_{i=1}^d Z_i (\partial_i H)^2 + \lambda H^4 +\cdots \right].$$

On a square lattice, symmetries guarantee that the coefficients Z_{i} of the derivative terms are all equal. But even for an anisotropic Ising model, where the Z_{i}'s in different directions are different, the fluctuations in H are isotropic in a coordinate system where the different directions of space are rescaled.

On any lattice, the derivative term
$$Z_{ij} \, \partial_i H \, \partial_j H$$
is a positive definite quadratic form, and can be used to define the metric for space. So any translationally invariant Ising model is rotationally invariant at long distances, in coordinates that make Z_{ij} = δ_{ij}. Rotational symmetry emerges spontaneously at large distances just because there aren't very many low order terms. At higher order multicritical points, this accidental symmetry is lost.

Since βF is a function of a slowly spatially varying field, the probability of any field configuration is (omitting higher-order terms):

$$P(H) \propto e^{ - \int d^dx \left[ AH^2 + Z |\nabla H|^2 + \lambda H^4 \right]} = e^{-\beta F[H]}.$$

The statistical average of any product of H terms is equal to:

$$\langle H(x_1) H(x_2)\cdots H(x_n) \rangle = { \int DH \, e^{ - \int d^dx \left[ A H^2 + Z  |\nabla H|^2 + \lambda H^4 \right]} H(x_1) H(x_2) \cdots H(x_n) \over \int DH \, e^{ - \int d^dx \left[ A H^2 + Z  |\nabla H|^2 + \lambda H^4 \right]} }.$$

The denominator in this expression is called the partition function:
$$Z = \int DH \, e^{ - \int d^dx \left[ A H^2 + Z  |\nabla H|^2 + \lambda H^4 \right]}$$
and the integral over all possible values of H is a statistical path integral. It integrates exp(βF) over all values of H, over all the long wavelength fourier components of the spins. F is a "Euclidean" Lagrangian for the field H. It is similar to the Lagrangian in of a scalar field in quantum field theory, the difference being that all the derivative terms enter with a positive sign, and there is no overall factor of i (thus "Euclidean").

== Dimensional analysis ==
The form of F can be used to predict which terms are most important by dimensional analysis. Dimensional analysis is not completely straightforward, because the scaling of H needs to be determined.

In the generic case, choosing the scaling law for H is easy, since the only term that contributes is the first one,

$$F = \int d^dx \, A H^2.$$

This term is the most significant, but it gives trivial behavior. This form of the free energy is ultralocal, meaning that it is a sum of an independent contribution from each point. This is like the spin-flips in the one-dimensional Ising model. Every value of H at any point fluctuates completely independently of the value at any other point.

The scale of the field can be redefined to absorb the coefficient A, and then it is clear that A only determines the overall scale of fluctuations. The ultralocal model describes the long wavelength high temperature behavior of the Ising model, since in this limit the fluctuation averages are independent from point to point.

To find the critical point, lower the temperature. As the temperature goes down, the fluctuations in H go up because the fluctuations are more correlated. This means that the average of a large number of spins does not become small as quickly as if they were uncorrelated, because they tend to be the same. This corresponds to decreasing A in the system of units where H does not absorb A. The phase transition can only happen when the subleading terms in F can contribute, but since the first term dominates at long distances, the coefficient A must be tuned to zero. This is the location of the critical point:

$$F= \int d^dx  \left[ t H^2 + \lambda H^4  + Z (\nabla H)^2 \right],$$

where t is a parameter which goes through zero at the transition.

Since t is vanishing, fixing the scale of the field using this term makes the other terms blow up. Once t is small, the scale of the field can either be set to fix the coefficient of the H^{4} term or the (∇H)^{2} term to 1.

== Magnetization ==
To find the magnetization, fix the scaling of H so that λ is one. Now the field H has dimension −d/4, so that H^{4}d^{d}x is dimensionless, and Z has dimension 2 − d/2. In this scaling, the gradient term is only important at long distances for d ≤ 4. Above four dimensions, at long wavelengths, the overall magnetization is only affected by the ultralocal terms.

There is one subtle point. The field H is fluctuating statistically, and the fluctuations can shift the zero point of t. To see how, consider H^{4} split in the following way:

$$H(x)^4 = -\langle H(x)^2\rangle^2  + 2\langle H(x)^2\rangle H(x)^2 + \left(H(x)^2 - \langle H(x)^2\rangle\right)^2$$

The first term is a constant contribution to the free energy, and can be ignored. The second term is a finite shift in t. The third term is a quantity that scales to zero at long distances. This means that when analyzing the scaling of t by dimensional analysis, it is the shifted t that is important. This was historically very confusing, because the shift in t at any finite λ is finite, but near the transition t is very small. The fractional change in t is very large, and in units where t is fixed the shift looks infinite.

The magnetization is at the minimum of the free energy, and this is an analytic equation. In terms of the shifted t,

$${\partial \over \partial H } \left( t H^2 + \lambda H^4 \right ) = 2t H + 4\lambda H^3 = 0$$

For t < 0, the minima are at H proportional to the square root of t. So Landau's catastrophe argument is correct in dimensions larger than 5. The magnetization exponent in dimensions higher than 5 is equal to the mean-field value.

When t is negative, the fluctuations about the new minimum are described by a new positive quadratic coefficient. Since this term always dominates, at temperatures below the transition the fluctuations again become ultralocal at long distances.

== Fluctuations ==
To find the behavior of fluctuations, rescale the field to fix the gradient term. Then the length scaling dimension of the field is 1 − d/2. Now the field has constant quadratic spatial fluctuations at all temperatures. The scale dimension of the H^{2} term is 2, while the scale dimension of the H^{4} term is 4 − d. For d < 4, the H^{4} term has positive scale dimension. In dimensions higher than 4 it has negative scale dimensions.

This is an essential difference. In dimensions higher than 4, fixing the scale of the gradient term means that the coefficient of the H^{4} term is less and less important at longer and longer wavelengths. The dimension at which nonquadratic contributions begin to contribute is known as the critical dimension. In the Ising model, the critical dimension is 4.

In dimensions above 4, the critical fluctuations are described by a purely quadratic free energy at long wavelengths. This means that the correlation functions are all computable from as Gaussian averages:

$$\langle S(x)S(y)\rangle \propto \langle H(x)H(y)\rangle = G(x-y)  = \int {dk \over (2\pi)^d} { e^{ik(x-y)}\over k^2 + t }$$

valid when x − y is large. The function G(x − y) is the analytic continuation to imaginary time of the Feynman propagator, since the free energy is the analytic continuation of the quantum field action for a free scalar field. For dimensions 5 and higher, all the other correlation functions at long distances are then determined by Wick's theorem. All the odd moments are zero, by ± symmetry. The even moments are the sum over all partition into pairs of the product of G(x − y) for each pair.

$$\langle S(x_1) S(x_2) \cdots S(x_{2n})\rangle = C^n \sum G(x_{i1},x_{j1}) G(x_{i2},x_{j2}) \ldots G(x_{in},x_{jn})$$

where C is the proportionality constant. So knowing G is enough. It determines all the multipoint correlations of the field.

== The critical two-point function ==
To determine the form of G, consider that the fields in a path integral obey the classical equations of motion derived by varying the free energy:

$$\begin{align}
&&\left(-\nabla_x^2 + t\right) \langle H(x)H(y) \rangle &= 0 \\
\rightarrow {} &&                                \nabla^2 G(x) + tG(x) &= 0
\end{align}$$

This is valid at noncoincident points only, since the correlations of H are singular when points collide. H obeys classical equations of motion for the same reason that quantum mechanical operators obey them—its fluctuations are defined by a path integral.

At the critical point t = 0, this is Laplace's equation, which can be solved by Gauss's method from electrostatics. Define an electric field analog by

$$E = \nabla G$$

Away from the origin:

$$\nabla \cdot E = 0$$

since G is spherically symmetric in d dimensions, and E is the radial gradient of G. Integrating over a large d − 1 dimensional sphere,

$$\int d^{d-1}S E_r = \mathrm{constant}$$

This gives:

$$E = {C \over r^{d-1} }$$

and G can be found by integrating with respect to r.

$$G(r) = {C \over r^{d-2} }$$

The constant C fixes the overall normalization of the field.

== G(r) away from the critical point ==
When t does not equal zero, so that H is fluctuating at a temperature slightly away from critical, the two point function decays at long distances. The equation it obeys is altered:

$$\nabla^2 G  + t G = 0 \to {1 \over r^{d - 1}} {d \over dr} \left( r^{d-1} {dG \over dr} \right) + t G(r) = 0$$

For r small compared with $\sqrt{t}$, the solution diverges exactly the same way as in the critical case, but the long distance behavior is modified.

To see how, it is convenient to represent the two point function as an integral, introduced by Schwinger in the quantum field theory context:

$$G(x) = \int d\tau  {1 \over \left(\sqrt{2\pi\tau}\right)^d} e^{-{x^2 \over 4\tau} - t\tau}$$

This is G, since the Fourier transform of this integral is easy. Each fixed τ contribution is a Gaussian in x, whose Fourier transform is another Gaussian of reciprocal width in k.

$$G(k) = \int d\tau  e^{-(k^2 - t)\tau} = {1 \over k^2 - t}$$

This is the inverse of the operator ∇^{2} − t in k-space, acting on the unit function in k-space, which is the Fourier transform of a delta function source localized at the origin. So it satisfies the same equation as G with the same boundary conditions that determine the strength of the divergence at 0.

The interpretation of the integral representation over the proper time τ is that the two point function is the sum over all random walk paths that link position 0 to position x over time τ. The density of these paths at time τ at position x is Gaussian, but the random walkers disappear at a steady rate proportional to t so that the Gaussian at time τ is diminished in height by a factor that decreases steadily exponentially. In the quantum field theory context, these are the paths of relativistically localized quanta in a formalism that follows the paths of individual particles. In the pure statistical context, these paths still appear by the mathematical correspondence with quantum fields, but their interpretation is less directly physical.

The integral representation immediately shows that G(r) is positive, since it is represented as a weighted sum of positive Gaussians. It also gives the rate of decay at large r, since the proper time for a random walk to reach position τ is r^{2} and in this time, the Gaussian height has decayed by $e^{-t\tau} = e^{-tr^2}$. The decay factor appropriate for position r is therefore $e^{-\sqrt t r}$.

A heuristic approximation for G(r) is:

$$G(r)  \approx { e^{-\sqrt t r} \over r^{d-2}}$$

This is not an exact form, except in three dimensions, where interactions between paths become important. The exact forms in high dimensions are variants of Bessel functions.

== Symanzik polymer interpretation ==
The interpretation of the correlations as fixed size quanta travelling along random walks gives a way of understanding why the critical dimension of the H^{4} interaction is 4. The term H^{4} can be thought of as the square of the density of the random walkers at any point. In order for such a term to alter the finite order correlation functions, which only introduce a few new random walks into the fluctuating environment, the new paths must intersect. Otherwise, the square of the density is just proportional to the density and only shifts the H^{2} coefficient by a constant. But the intersection probability of random walks depends on the dimension, and random walks in dimension higher than 4 do not intersect.

The fractal dimension of an ordinary random walk is 2. The number of balls of size ε required to cover the path increase as ε^{−2}. Two objects of fractal dimension 2 will intersect with reasonable probability only in a space of dimension 4 or less, the same condition as for a generic pair of planes. Kurt Symanzik argued that this implies that the critical Ising fluctuations in dimensions higher than 4 should be described by a free field. This argument eventually became a mathematical proof.

== 4 − ε dimensions – renormalization group ==
The Ising model in four dimensions is described by a fluctuating field, but now the fluctuations are interacting. In the polymer representation, intersections of random walks are marginally possible. In the quantum field continuation, the quanta interact.

The negative logarithm of the probability of any field configuration H is the free energy function

$$F= \int d^4 x  \left[ {Z \over 2} |\nabla H|^2 + {t\over 2} H^2  + {\lambda \over 4!} H^4 \right] \,$$

The numerical factors are there to simplify the equations of motion. The goal is to understand the statistical fluctuations. Like any other non-quadratic path integral, the correlation functions have a Feynman expansion as particles travelling along random walks, splitting and rejoining at vertices. The interaction strength is parametrized by the classically dimensionless quantity λ.

Although dimensional analysis shows that both λ and Z are dimensionless, this is misleading. The long wavelength statistical fluctuations are not exactly scale invariant, and only become scale invariant when the interaction strength vanishes.

The reason is that there is a cutoff used to define H, and the cutoff defines the shortest wavelength. Fluctuations of H at wavelengths near the cutoff can affect the longer-wavelength fluctuations. If the system is scaled along with the cutoff, the parameters will scale by dimensional analysis, but then comparing parameters doesn't compare behavior because the rescaled system has more modes. If the system is rescaled in such a way that the short wavelength cutoff remains fixed, the long-wavelength fluctuations are modified.

=== Wilson renormalization ===
A quick heuristic way of studying the scaling is to cut off the H wavenumbers at a point λ. Fourier modes of H with wavenumbers larger than λ are not allowed to fluctuate. A rescaling of length that make the whole system smaller increases all wavenumbers, and moves some fluctuations above the cutoff.

To restore the old cutoff, perform a partial integration over all the wavenumbers which used to be forbidden, but are now fluctuating. In Feynman diagrams, integrating over a fluctuating mode at wavenumber k links up lines carrying momentum k in a correlation function in pairs, with a factor of the inverse propagator.

Under rescaling, when the system is shrunk by a factor of (1+b), the t coefficient scales up by a factor (1+b)^{2} by dimensional analysis. The change in t for infinitesimal b is 2bt. The other two coefficients are dimensionless and do not change at all.

The lowest order effect of integrating out can be calculated from the equations of motion:

$$\nabla^2 H + t H = - {\lambda \over 6} H^3.$$

This equation is an identity inside any correlation function away from other insertions. After integrating out the modes with Λ < k < (1+b)Λ, it will be a slightly different identity.

Since the form of the equation will be preserved, to find the change in coefficients it is sufficient to analyze the change in the H^{3} term. In a Feynman diagram expansion, the H^{3} term in a correlation function inside a correlation has three dangling lines. Joining two of them at large wavenumber k gives a change H^{3} with one dangling line, so proportional to H:

$$\delta H^3 = 3H \int_{\Lambda<|k|<(1 + b)\Lambda} {d^4k \over (2\pi)^4}  {1\over (k^2 + t)}$$

The factor of 3 comes from the fact that the loop can be closed in three different ways.

The integral should be split into two parts:

$$\int dk {1 \over k^2} - t \int dk { 1\over k^2(k^2 + t)} = A\Lambda^2 b + B  b t$$

The first part is not proportional to t, and in the equation of motion it can be absorbed by a constant shift in t. It is caused by the fact that the H^{3} term has a linear part. Only the second term, which varies from t to t, contributes to the critical scaling.

This new linear term adds to the first term on the left hand side, changing t by an amount proportional to t. The total change in t is the sum of the term from dimensional analysis and this second term from operator products:

$$\delta t = \left(2 - {B\lambda \over 2} \right)b t$$

So t is rescaled, but its dimension is anomalous, it is changed by an amount proportional to the value of λ.

But λ also changes. The change in λ requires considering the lines splitting and then quickly rejoining. The lowest order process is one where one of the three lines from H^{3} splits into three, which quickly joins with one of the other lines from the same vertex. The correction to the vertex is

$$\delta \lambda = - {3 \lambda^2 \over 2} \int_k dk {1 \over (k^2 + t)^2} = -{3\lambda^2 \over 2} b$$

The numerical factor is three times bigger because there is an extra factor of three in choosing which of the three new lines to contract. So

$$\delta \lambda = - 3 B \lambda^2 b$$

These two equations together define the renormalization group equations in four dimensions:

$$\begin{align}
{dt \over t} &= \left(2  - {B\lambda \over 2}\right) b \\
{d\lambda \over \lambda} &= {-3 B \lambda \over 2} b
\end{align}$$

The coefficient B is determined by the formula
$$B b  = \int_{\Lambda<|k|<(1+b)\Lambda} {d^4k\over (2\pi)^4} {1 \over k^4}$$

and is proportional to the area of a three-dimensional sphere of radius λ, times the width of the integration region bΛ divided by Λ^{4}:
$$B= (2 \pi^2 \Lambda^3) {1\over (2\pi)^4} { b \Lambda} {1 \over b\Lambda^4} = {1\over 8\pi^2}$$

In other dimensions, the constant B changes, but the same constant appears both in the t flow and in the coupling flow. The reason is that the derivative with respect to t of the closed loop with a single vertex is a closed loop with two vertices. This means that the only difference between the scaling of the coupling and the t is the combinatorial factors from joining and splitting.

=== Wilson–Fisher fixed point ===
To investigate three dimensions starting from the four-dimensional theory should be possible, because the intersection probabilities of random walks depend continuously on the dimensionality of the space. In the language of Feynman graphs, the coupling does not change very much when the dimension is changed.

The process of continuing away from dimension 4 is not completely well defined without a prescription for how to do it. The prescription is only well defined on diagrams. It replaces the Schwinger representation in dimension 4 with the Schwinger representation in dimension 4 − ε defined by:
$$G(x-y) = \int d\tau {1 \over t^{d\over 2}} e^{{x^2 \over 2\tau} + t \tau}$$

In dimension 4 − ε, the coupling λ has positive scale dimension ε, and this must be added to the flow.

$$\begin{align}
{d\lambda \over \lambda} &= \varepsilon - 3 B \lambda \\
{dt \over t} &= 2 - \lambda  B
\end{align}$$

The coefficient B is dimension dependent, but it will cancel. The fixed point for λ is no longer zero, but at:
$$\lambda = {\varepsilon \over 3B}$$
where the scale dimensions of t is altered by an amount λB = ε/3.

The magnetization exponent is altered proportionately to:
$$\tfrac{1}{2} \left( 1 - {\varepsilon \over 3}\right)$$

which is .333 in 3 dimensions (ε = 1) and .166 in 2 dimensions (ε = 2). This is not so far off from the measured exponent .308 and the Onsager two dimensional exponent .125.

== Infinite dimensions – mean field ==
The behavior of an Ising model on a fully connected graph may be completely understood by mean-field theory. This type of description is appropriate to very-high-dimensional square lattices, because then each site has a very large number of neighbors.

The idea is that if each spin is connected to a large number of spins, only the average ratio of + spins to − spins is important, since the fluctuations about this mean will be small. The mean field H is the average fraction of spins which are + minus the average fraction of spins which are −. The energy cost of flipping a single spin in the mean field H is ±2JNH. It is convenient to redefine J to absorb the factor N, so that the limit N → ∞ is smooth. In terms of the new J, the energy cost for flipping a spin is ±2JH.

This energy cost gives the ratio of probability p that the spin is + to the probability 1−p that the spin is −. This ratio is the Boltzmann factor:
$${p\over 1-p} = e^{2\beta JH}$$

so that
$$p = {1 \over 1 + e^{-2\beta JH} }$$

The mean value of the spin is given by averaging 1 and −1 with the weights p and 1 − p, so the mean value is 2p − 1. But this average is the same for all spins, and is therefore equal to H.
$$H = 2p - 1 = { 1 - e^{-2\beta JH} \over 1 + e^{-2\beta JH}} = \tanh (\beta JH)$$

The solutions to this equation are the possible consistent mean fields. For βJ < 1 there is only the one solution at H = 0. For bigger values of β there are three solutions, and the solution at H = 0 is unstable.

The instability means that increasing the mean field above zero a little bit produces a statistical fraction of spins which are + which is bigger than the value of the mean field. So a mean field which fluctuates above zero will produce an even greater mean field, and will eventually settle at the stable solution. This means that for temperatures below the critical value βJ = 1 the mean-field Ising model undergoes a phase transition in the limit of large N.

Above the critical temperature, fluctuations in H are damped because the mean field restores the fluctuation to zero field. Below the critical temperature, the mean field is driven to a new equilibrium value, which is either the positive H or negative H solution to the equation.

For βJ = 1 + ε, just below the critical temperature, the value of H can be calculated from the Taylor expansion of the hyperbolic tangent:
$$H = \tanh(\beta J H)  \approx (1+\varepsilon)H - {(1+\varepsilon)^3H^3\over 3}$$

Dividing by H to discard the unstable solution at H = 0, the stable solutions are:
$$H = \sqrt{3\varepsilon}$$

The spontaneous magnetization H grows near the critical point as the square root of the change in temperature. This is true whenever H can be calculated from the solution of an analytic equation which is symmetric between positive and negative values, which led Landau to suspect that all Ising type phase transitions in all dimensions should follow this law.

The mean-field exponent is universal because changes in the character of solutions of analytic equations are always described by catastrophes in the Taylor series, which is a polynomial equation. By symmetry, the equation for H must only have odd powers of H on the right hand side. Changing β should only smoothly change the coefficients. The transition happens when the coefficient of H on the right hand side is 1. Near the transition:
$$H = {\partial (\beta F) \over \partial h} = (1+A\varepsilon) H + B H^3 + \cdots$$

Whatever A and B are, so long as neither of them is tuned to zero, the spontaneous magnetization will grow as the square root of ε. This argument can only fail if the free energy βF is either non-analytic or non-generic at the exact β where the transition occurs.

But the spontaneous magnetization in magnetic systems and the density in gasses near the critical point are measured very accurately. The density and the magnetization in three dimensions have the same power-law dependence on the temperature near the critical point, but the behavior from experiments is:
$$H \propto \varepsilon^{0.308}$$

The exponent is also universal, since it is the same in the Ising model as in the experimental magnet and gas, but it is not equal to the mean-field value. This was a great surprise.

This is also true in two dimensions, where
$$H \propto \varepsilon^{0.125}$$

But there it was not a surprise, because it was predicted by Onsager.

== Low dimensions – block spins ==
In three dimensions, the perturbative series from the field theory is an expansion in a coupling constant λ which is not particularly small. The effective size of the coupling at the fixed point is one over the branching factor of the particle paths, so the expansion parameter is about 1/3. In two dimensions, the perturbative expansion parameter is 2/3.

But renormalization can also be productively applied to the spins directly, without passing to an average field. Historically, this approach is due to Leo Kadanoff and predated the perturbative ε expansion.

The idea is to integrate out lattice spins iteratively, generating a flow in couplings. But now the couplings are lattice energy coefficients. The fact that a continuum description exists guarantees that this iteration will converge to a fixed point when the temperature is tuned to criticality.

=== Migdal–Kadanoff renormalization ===
Write the two-dimensional Ising model with an infinite number of possible higher order interactions. To keep spin reflection symmetry, only even powers contribute:
$$E = \sum_{ij} J_{ij} S_i S_j + \sum J_{ijkl} S_i S_j S_k S_l \ldots.$$

By translation invariance, J_{ij} is only a function of i-j. By the accidental rotational symmetry, at large i and j its size only depends on the magnitude of the two-dimensional vector i − j. The higher order coefficients are also similarly restricted.

The renormalization iteration divides the lattice into two parts – even spins and odd spins. The odd spins live on the odd-checkerboard lattice positions, and the even ones on the even-checkerboard. When the spins are indexed by the position (i,j), the odd sites are those with i + j odd and the even sites those with i + j even, and even sites are only connected to odd sites.

The two possible values of the odd spins will be integrated out, by summing over both possible values. This will produce a new free energy function for the remaining even spins, with new adjusted couplings. The even spins are again in a lattice, with axes tilted at 45 degrees to the old ones. Unrotating the system restores the old configuration, but with new parameters. These parameters describe the interaction between spins at distances $\sqrt{2}$ larger.

Starting from the Ising model and repeating this iteration eventually changes all the couplings. When the temperature is higher than the critical temperature, the couplings will converge to zero, since the spins at large distances are uncorrelated. But when the temperature is critical, there will be nonzero coefficients linking spins at all orders. The flow can be approximated by only considering the first few terms. This truncated flow will produce better and better approximations to the critical exponents when more terms are included.

The simplest approximation is to keep only the usual J term, and discard everything else. This will generate a flow in J, analogous to the flow in t at the fixed point of λ in the ε expansion.

To find the change in J, consider the four neighbors of an odd site. These are the only spins which interact with it. The multiplicative contribution to the partition function from the sum over the two values of the spin at the odd site is:
$$e^{J (N_+ - N_-)} + e^{J (N_- - N_+)} = 2 \cosh(J[N_+ - N_-])$$

where N_{±} is the number of neighbors which are ±. Ignoring the factor of 2, the free energy contribution from this odd site is:
$$F = \log(\cosh[J(N_+ - N_-)]).$$

This includes nearest neighbor and next-nearest neighbor interactions, as expected, but also a four-spin interaction which is to be discarded. To truncate to nearest neighbor interactions, consider that the difference in energy between all spins the same and equal numbers + and – is:
$$\Delta F = \ln(\cosh[4J]).$$

From nearest neighbor couplings, the difference in energy between all spins equal and staggered spins is 8J. The difference in energy between all spins equal and nonstaggered but net zero spin is 4J. Ignoring four-spin interactions, a reasonable truncation is the average of these two energies or 6J. Since each link will contribute to two odd spins, the right value to compare with the previous one is half that:
$$3J' =  \ln(\cosh[4J]).$$

For small J, this quickly flows to zero coupling. Large J's flow to large couplings. The magnetization exponent is determined from the slope of the equation at the fixed point.

Variants of this method produce good numerical approximations for the critical exponents when many terms are included, in both two and three dimensions. However, its performance grows worse as the dimension grows larger.
