= Källén–Lehmann spectral representation =

Expression for two-point correlation functions

The Källén–Lehmann spectral representation, or simply Lehmann representation, gives a general expression for the (time ordered) two-point function of an interacting quantum field theory as a sum of free propagators. It was discovered by Gunnar Källén in 1952, and independently by Harry Lehmann in 1954. This can be written as, using the mostly-minus metric signature,

$$\Delta(p)=\int_0^\infty d\mu^2\rho(\mu^2)\frac{1}{p^2-\mu^2+i\epsilon},$$

where $\rho(\mu^2)$ is the spectral density function that should be positive definite. In a gauge theory, this latter condition cannot be granted but nevertheless a spectral representation can be provided. This belongs to non-perturbative techniques of quantum field theory.

== Mathematical derivation ==
The following derivation employs the mostly-minus metric signature.

In order to derive a spectral representation for the propagator of a field $\Phi(x)$, one considers a complete set of states $\{|n\rangle\}$ so that, for the two-point function one can write

$$\langle 0|\Phi(x)\Phi^\dagger(y)|0\rangle=\sum_n\langle 0|\Phi(x)|n\rangle\langle n|\Phi^\dagger(y)|0\rangle.$$

We can now use Poincaré invariance of the vacuum to write down

$$\langle 0|\Phi(x)\Phi^\dagger(y)|0\rangle=\sum_n e^{-ip_n\cdot(x-y)}|\langle 0|\Phi(0)|n\rangle|^2.$$

Next we introduce the spectral density function

$$\rho(p^2)\theta(p_0)(2\pi)^{-3}=\sum_n\delta^4(p-p_n)|\langle 0|\Phi(0)|n\rangle|^2$$.

Where we have used the fact that our two-point function, being a function of $p_\mu$, can only depend on $p^2$. Besides, all the intermediate states have $p^2\ge 0$ and $p_0>0$. It is immediate to realize that the spectral density function is real and positive. So, one can write

$$\langle 0|\Phi(x)\Phi^\dagger(y)|0\rangle = \int\frac{d^4p}{(2\pi)^3}\int_0^\infty d\mu^2e^{-ip\cdot(x-y)}\rho(\mu^2)\theta(p_0)\delta(p^2-\mu^2)$$

and we freely interchange the integration, this should be done carefully from a mathematical standpoint but here we ignore this, and write this expression as

$$\langle 0|\Phi(x)\Phi^\dagger(y)|0\rangle = \int_0^\infty d\mu^2\rho(\mu^2)\Delta'(x-y;\mu^2)$$

where

$$\Delta'(x-y;\mu^2)=\int\frac{d^4p}{(2\pi)^3}e^{-ip\cdot(x-y)}\theta(p_0)\delta(p^2-\mu^2)$$.

From the CPT theorem we also know that an identical expression holds for $\langle 0|\Phi^\dagger(x)\Phi(y)|0\rangle$ and so we arrive at the expression for the time-ordered product of fields

$$\langle 0|T\Phi(x)\Phi^\dagger(y)|0\rangle = \int_0^\infty d\mu^2\rho(\mu^2)\Delta(x-y;\mu^2)$$

where now

$$\Delta(p;\mu^2)=\frac{1}{p^2-\mu^2+i\epsilon}$$

a free particle propagator. Now, as we have the exact propagator given by the time-ordered two-point function, we have obtained the spectral decomposition.

== Bibliography ==
- Weinberg, S. (1995). The Quantum Theory of Fields: Volume I Foundations. Cambridge University Press. ISBN 978-0-521-55001-7.
- Peskin, Michael; Schroeder, Daniel (1995). An Introduction to Quantum Field Theory. Perseus Books Group. ISBN 978-0-201-50397-5.
- Zinn-Justin, Jean (1996). Quantum Field Theory and Critical Phenomena (3rd ed.). Clarendon Press. ISBN 978-0-19-851882-2.
