= Vladimir Jurko Glaser =

Croatian theoretical physicist

Vladimir Jurko Glaser (21 April 1924 – 22 January 1984) was a Croatian theoretical physicist working on quantum field theory and the canonization of the analytic S-matrix.

== Biography ==
Glaser was born in Gorizia, Italy. His father, Vladimir Glaser, was a prominent Slovene lawyer and minority rights activist. His mother, Ana née Besednjak, was the sister of the politician Engelbert Besednjak. His paternal aunt Eleonora (Lola) was married to the famous neurologist Constantin von Economo.

The family fled to Yugoslavia in 1929, first to Maribor, then to Belgrade, Odžaci and finally to Zagreb in 1941. He graduated physics from the University of Zagreb in 1949 and later was attending seminar of Werner Heisenberg (1951-52) at Göttingen. Based on work carried out in Göttingen under Heisenberg he received a doctorate degree from the University of Zagreb. Being a part of Heisenberg's group at Göttingen he later worked with many famous physicists such as Harry Lehmann, Wolfhart Zimmermann (on extensions of LSZ formalism) and Walter Thirring. From 1955 to 1957 he was head of the Department of Theoretical Physics at the Ruđer Bošković Institute in Zagreb. In 1957 he found a permanent employment at the Department of Theoretical Physics of CERN, Geneva. He died in Geneva.

In 1955, he published one of the first monographs on quantum electrodynamics, Kovarijantna kvantna elektrodinamika (in Croatian). With French physicists Jacques Bros and Henri Epstein he worked on setting up analyticity properties required for the use of dispersion relations in high energy collisions. Epstein, Glaser and Arthur Jaffe proved that (Wightman) quantum fields can necessarily have negative energy density values. Together with Henri Epstein, he found a new approach to renormalization theory called causal perturbation theory, where ultraviolet divergences are avoided in the calculation of Feynman diagrams by using mathematically well-defined quantities only.
