= Edge-of-the-wedge theorem =

Theorem of analytic continuations

In mathematics, the edge-of-the-wedge theorem implies that holomorphic functions on two "wedges" with an "edge" in common are analytic continuations of each other provided they both give the same continuous function on the edge. It is used in quantum field theory to construct the analytic continuation of Wightman functions. The formulation and the first proof of the theorem were presented by Nikolay Bogoliubov at the International Conference on Theoretical Physics, Seattle, USA (September, 1956) and also published in the book Problems in the Theory of Dispersion Relations in 1958. The name of the theorem was coined by Hans-Joachim Bremermann, Reinhard Oehme and John G. Taylor who also demonstrated it in 1958.

Further proofs and generalizations of the theorem were given by Res Jost and Harry Lehmann (1957), Freeman Dyson (1958), H. Epstein (1960), and by other researchers.

== One-dimensional case ==
=== Continuous boundary values ===
In one dimension, a simple case of the edge-of-the-wedge theorem can be stated as follows.

- Suppose that f is a continuous complex-valued function on the complex plane that is holomorphic on the upper half-plane, and on the lower half-plane. Then it is holomorphic everywhere.

In this example, the two wedges are the upper half-plane and the lower half plane, and their common edge is the real axis. This result can be proved from Morera's theorem. Indeed, a function is holomorphic provided its integral round any contour vanishes; a contour which crosses the real axis can be broken up into contours in the upper and lower half-planes and the integral round these vanishes by hypothesis.

=== Distributional boundary values on a circle ===
The more general case is phrased in terms of distributions. This is technically simplest in the case where the common boundary is the unit circle $|z|=1$ in the complex plane. In that case holomorphic functions f, g in the regions $r<|z|<1$ and $1<|z| <R$ have Laurent expansions

$$f(z)= \sum_{-\infty}^\infty a_n z^n,\,\,\,\, g(z)=\sum_{-\infty}^\infty b_n z^n$$

absolutely convergent in the same regions and have distributional boundary values given by the formal Fourier series

$$f(\theta)= \sum_{-\infty}^\infty a_n e^{in\theta},\,\,\,\, g(\theta)= \sum_{-\infty}^\infty b_n e^{in\theta}.$$

Their distributional boundary values are equal if $a_n=b_n$ for all n. It is then elementary that the common Laurent series converges absolutely in the whole region $r<|z|<R$.

=== Distributional boundary values on an interval ===
In general given an open interval $I=(a,b)$ on the real axis and holomorphic functions $f_+,\,\,\ f_-$ defined in $(a,b) \times (0,R)$ and $(a,b)\times (-R,0)$ satisfying

$$|f_\pm(x +iy)|< C |y|^{-N}$$

for some non-negative integer N, the boundary values $T_\pm$ of $f_\pm$ can be defined as distributions on the real axis by the formulas

$$\langle T_\pm,\varphi\rangle =\lim_{\varepsilon\downarrow 0} \int f(x\pm i\varepsilon) \varphi(x) \, dx.$$

Existence can be proved by noting that, under the hypothesis, $f_\pm(z)$ is the $(N+1)$-th complex derivative of a holomorphic function which extends to a continuous function on the boundary. If f is defined as $f_\pm$ above and below the real axis and F is the distribution defined on the rectangle $(a,b)\times (-R,R)$ by the formula

$$\langle F,\varphi\rangle =\iint f(x+iy)\varphi(x,y)\, dx\, dy,$$

then F equals $f_\pm$ off the real axis and the distribution $F_{\overline{z}}$ is induced by the distribution ${1\over 2} (T_+-T_-)$ on the real axis.

In particular if the hypotheses of the edge-of-the-wedge theorem apply, i.e. $T_+=T_-$, then

$$F_{\overline{z}}=0.$$

By elliptic regularity it then follows that the function F is holomorphic in $(a,b)\times (-R,R)$.

In this case elliptic regularity can be deduced directly from the fact that $(\pi z)^{-1}$ is known to provide a fundamental solution for the Cauchy–Riemann operator $\partial/\partial\overline{z}$.

Using the Cayley transform between the circle and the real line, this argument can be rephrased in a standard way in terms of Fourier series and Sobolev spaces on the circle. Indeed, let $f$ and $g$ be holomorphic functions defined exterior and interior to some arc on the unit circle such that locally they have radial limits in some Sobolev space, Then, letting

$$D= z{\partial\over \partial z},$$

the equations

$$D^k F=f,\,\,\, D^k G =g$$

can be solved locally in such a way that the radial limits of G and F tend locally to the same function in a higher Sobolev space. For k large enough, this convergence is uniform by the Sobolev embedding theorem. By the argument for continuous functions, F and G therefore patch to give a holomorphic function near the arc and hence so do f and g.

== General case ==
A wedge is a product of a cone with some set.

Let $C$ be an open cone in the real vector space $\mathbb{R}^n$, with vertex at the origin. Let E be an open subset of $\mathbb{R}^n$, called the edge. Write W for the wedge $E\times iC$ in the complex vector space $\mathbb{C}^n$, and write W' for the opposite wedge $E\times -iC$. Then the two wedges W and W' meet at the edge E, where we identify E with the product of E with the tip of the cone.

- Suppose that f is a continuous function on the union $W \cup E\cup W'$ that is holomorphic on both the wedges W and W' . Then the edge-of-the-wedge theorem says that f is also holomorphic on E (or more precisely, it can be extended to a holomorphic function on a neighborhood of E).

The conditions for the theorem to be true can be weakened. It is not necessary to assume that f is defined on the whole of the wedges: it is enough to assume that it is defined near the edge. It is also not necessary to assume that f is defined or continuous on the edge: it is sufficient to assume that the functions defined on either of the wedges have the same distributional boundary values on the edge.

== Application to quantum field theory ==
In quantum field theory the Wightman distributions are boundary values of Wightman functions W(z_{1}, ..., z_{n}) depending on variables z_{i} in the complexification of Minkowski spacetime. They are defined and holomorphic in the wedge where the imaginary part of each z_{i}−z_{i−1} lies in the open positive timelike cone. By permuting the variables we get n! different Wightman functions defined in n! different wedges. By applying the edge-of-the-wedge theorem (with the edge given by the set of totally spacelike points) one can deduce that the Wightman functions are all analytic continuations of the same holomorphic function, defined on a connected region containing all n! wedges. (The equality of the boundary values on the edge that we need to apply the edge-of-the-wedge theorem follows from the locality axiom of quantum field theory.)

== Connection with hyperfunctions ==
The edge-of-the-wedge theorem has a natural interpretation in the language of hyperfunctions. A hyperfunction is roughly a sum of boundary values of holomorphic functions, and can also be thought of as something like a "distribution of infinite order". The analytic wave front set of a hyperfunction at each point is a cone in the cotangent space of that point, and can be thought of as describing the directions in which the singularity at that point is moving.

In the edge-of-the-wedge theorem, we have a distribution (or hyperfunction) f on the edge, given as the boundary values of two holomorphic functions on the two wedges. If a hyperfunction is the boundary value of a holomorphic function on a wedge, then its analytic wave front set lies in the dual of the corresponding cone. So the analytic wave front set of f lies in the duals of two opposite cones. But the intersection of these duals is empty, so the analytic wave front set of f is empty, which implies that f is analytic. This is the edge-of-the-wedge theorem.

In the theory of hyperfunctions there is an extension of the edge-of-the-wedge theorem to the case when there are several wedges instead of two, called Martineau's edge-of-the-wedge theorem. See the book by Hörmander for details.
