= Zeldovich regularization =

Zeldovich regularization refers to a regularization method to calculate divergent integrals and divergent series, that was first introduced by Yakov Zeldovich in 1961. Zeldovich was originally interested in calculating the norm of the Gamow wave function which is divergent since there is an outgoing spherical wave. Zeldovich regularization uses a Gaussian type-regularization and is defined, for divergent integrals, by

$$\int_0^\infty f(x)  dx \equiv \lim_{\alpha\to 0^+}\int_0^\infty f(x) e^{-\alpha x^2} dx.$$

and, for divergent series, by

$$\sum_n c_n  \equiv \lim_{\alpha\to 0^+}\sum_n c_n e^{-\alpha n^2}.$$

== See also ==
- Abel's theorem
- Borel summation
