= Hagedorn temperature =

Temperature at which the partition function of a statistical-mechanical system diverges

The Hagedorn temperature, T_{H}, is the temperature in theoretical physics above which hadronic matter (i.e. ordinary matter) is no longer stable, and must either "evaporate" or convert into quark matter; as such, it can be thought of as the "boiling point" of hadronic matter. It was discovered by Rolf Hagedorn. The Hagedorn temperature exists because the amount of energy available is high enough that matter particle (quark–antiquark) pairs can be spontaneously pulled from vacuum. Thus, naively considered, a system at Hagedorn temperature can accommodate as much energy as one can put in, because the formed quarks provide new degrees of freedom. However, if this phase is viewed as quarks instead, it becomes apparent that the matter has transformed into quark matter, which can be further heated.

The Hagedorn temperature, T_{H}, is about 150 MeV/k_{B} or about 1.7×10^{12} K, little above the mass–energy of the lightest hadrons, the pion. Hagedorn was able not only to give a simple explanation for the thermodynamical aspect of high energy particle production, but also worked out a formula for the hadronic mass spectrum and predicted the limiting temperature for hot hadronic systems.

In string theory, a separate Hagedorn temperature can be defined for strings rather than hadrons. This temperature is extremely high (10^{30} K) and thus of mainly theoretical interest.

== History ==
The Hagedorn temperature was discovered by German physicist Rolf Hagedorn in the 1960s while working at CERN. His work on the statistical bootstrap model of hadron production showed that because increases in energy in a system will cause new particles to be produced, an increase of collision energy will increase the entropy of the system rather than the temperature, and "the temperature becomes stuck at a limiting value".

== Technical explanation ==
A self-consistency principle was applied by Rolf Hagedorn in 1965 to explain the thermodynamics of fireballs in high energy physics collisions. A thermodynamical approach to the high energy collisions was first proposed by E. Fermi.

The partition function of the fireballs can be written in two forms, one in terms of its density of states, $\sigma(E)$, and the other in terms of its mass spectrum, $\rho(m)$. The self-consistency principle says that both forms must be asymptotically equivalent for energies or masses sufficiently high (asymptotic limit). Also, the density of states and the mass spectrum must be asymptotically equivalent in the sense of the weak constraint proposed by Hagedorn as

$$\log[\rho(m)]= \log[\sigma(E)].$$

These two conditions are known as the self-consistency principle or bootstrap-idea. After a long mathematical analysis Hagedorn was able to prove that there is in fact $\textstyle \rho(m)$ and $\textstyle \sigma(E)$ satisfying the above conditions, resulting in

$$\rho(m) = a m^{-5/2} \exp(\beta_o m)$$

and

$$\sigma(E) = b E^{\alpha -1} \exp(\beta_o E)$$

with $\textstyle a$ and $\textstyle \alpha$ related by

$$\alpha=\frac{a V}{(2 \pi \beta)^{3/5}}.$$

Then the asymptotic partition function is given by

$$Z_q(V_o,T)=\bigg(\frac{1}{\beta - \beta _o }\bigg)^{\alpha}-1$$

where a singularity is clearly observed for $\beta$ →$\beta_o$.

This singularity determines the limiting temperature $\textstyle T_o=1/\beta _o$ in Hagedorn's theory, which is also known as Hagedorn temperature (T_{H}).

Hagedorn temperature is the temperature above which the partition sum diverges in a system with exponential growth in the density of states.
$$\lim_{T\rightarrow T_\text{H}^-} \operatorname{Tr}\left[e^{-\beta H}\right] = \infty$$
where $\beta = 1/k_\text{B}T$, $k_\text{B}$ being the Boltzmann constant.

Because of the divergence, people may come to the incorrect conclusion that it is impossible to have temperatures above the Hagedorn temperature, which would make it the absolute hot temperature, because it would require an infinite amount of energy. In equations:
$$\lim_{T\rightarrow T_\text{H}^-}E = \lim_{T\rightarrow T_\text{H}^-}\frac{\operatorname{Tr}\left[H e^{-\beta H}\right]}{\operatorname{Tr}\left[e^{-\beta H}\right]} = \infty$$

This line of reasoning was well known to be false even to Hagedorn. The partition function for creation of hydrogen–antihydrogen pairs diverges even more rapidly, because it gets a finite contribution from energy levels that accumulate at the ionization energy. The states that cause the divergence are spatially big, since the electrons are very far from the protons. The divergence indicates that at a low temperature hydrogen–antihydrogen will not be produced, rather proton/antiproton and electron/antielectron. The Hagedorn temperature is only a maximum temperature in the physically unrealistic case of exponentially many species with energy E and finite size.

After some time this limiting temperature was shown by N. Cabibbo and G. Parisi to be related to a phase transition, which characterizes by the deconfinement of quarks at high energies. The mass spectrum was further analyzed by Steven Frautschi.

The concept of exponential growth in the number of states was originally proposed in the context of condensed matter physics. It was incorporated into high-energy physics in the early 1970s by Steven Frautschi and Hagedorn. In hadronic physics, the Hagedorn temperature is the deconfinement temperature.

== In string theory ==
In string theory, it indicates a phase transition: the transition at which very long strings are copiously produced. It is controlled by the size of the string tension, which is smaller than the Planck scale by some power of the coupling constant. By adjusting the tension to be small compared to the Planck scale, the Hagedorn transition can be much less than the Planck temperature. Traditional grand unified string models place this in the magnitude of 10^{30} K, two orders of magnitude smaller than the Planck temperature. Such temperatures have not been reached in any experiment and are far beyond the reach of current, or even foreseeable, technology.

== See also ==
- Heat
- Thermodynamic temperature
