= Wolfhart Zimmermann =

German theoretical physicist

- Born: 17 February 1928; Freiburg im Breisgau, Germany
- Died: 18 September 2016 (aged 88); Hamburg, Germany
- Known for: LSZ reduction formula BPHZ Renormalization scheme
- Awards: Max Planck Medal (1991)
- Scientific career
- Fields: Quantum field theory
- Workplaces: Max Planck Institute; New York University; University of Hamburg
- Thesis: Eine Kohomologietheorie topologischer Räume (1950)

Wolfhart Zimmermann (17 February 1928 – 18 September 2016) was a German theoretical physicist, known for his contribution in quantum field theory. He is one of the developers of the LSZ reduction formula.

== Biography ==
Zimmermann was born in Freiburg im Breisgau.

Zimmermann attained a doctorate in 1950 at Albert Ludwig University of Freiburg in topology.

In 1952, he joined the group of Werner Heisenberg at the Max Planck Institute in Göttingen. There he became one of the pioneers of the mathematical quantum field theory. He developed the LSZ theory with Kurt Symanzik and Harry Lehmann. Their research group was referred as the Field Club (German: Feldverein) by Wolfgang Pauli.

From 1962 to 1974 he was a professor at the New York University. From 1974 to 1996 he was a director at the Max Planck Institute for physics in Munich, later becoming the "Director Emeritus".

Since 1977 he was an honorary professor ("Honorarprofessor") at the Technical University of Munich. He took a year-long sabbatical stay at the Institute for Advanced Study in Princeton (1957/8 and 1960/1), at the Courant Institute of Mathematical Sciences of New York University, at the University of Chicago and at IHES in Paris. In addition to his work on the LSZ formalism he is also known for the development of Bogolyubov - Parasiuk renormalization schema (also BPHZ Renormalization schema named after Klaus Hepp and Zimmermann). Along with Kenneth G. Wilson he was one of the pioneers in applications of operator product expansion in quantum field theory. With Reinhard Oehme of the Enrico Fermi Institute in Chicago (with whom he already collaborated in Göttingen in the 1950s), he worked on the reduction of coupling parameters with group renormalization methods and introduced superconvergence relations for the propagator (gauge field propagator) into Yang–Mills theory, to establish connections between the borders of high energy (e.g. asymptotic freedom) and low energy (confinement).

In 1991 he received the Max Planck medal.

== Sources ==
- Peter Breitenlohner (Ed.) "Quantum Field Theory- Proceedings on the Ringberg Workshop, Tegernsee 1998, On the Occasion of Wolfhart Zimmermann´s 70. Birthday", Lecture Notes in Physics 558, Springer, 1998.
- Zimmermann "Local operator products and renormalization in Quantum Field Theory", Brandeis Summer Institute in Theoretical Physics Lectures 1970, pp. 399–589
