= Ultraviolet divergence =

Divergences arising from high energy physics

In physics, an ultraviolet divergence or UV divergence is a situation in which an integral, for example a Feynman diagram, diverges because of contributions of objects with unbounded energy, or, equivalently, because of physical phenomena at infinitesimal distances.

== Overview ==
Since an infinite result is unphysical, ultraviolet divergences often require special treatment to remove unphysical effects inherent in the perturbative formalisms. In particular, UV divergences can often be removed by regularization and renormalization. Successful resolution of an ultraviolet divergence is known as ultraviolet completion. If they cannot be removed, they imply that the theory is not perturbatively well-defined at very short distances.

The name comes from the earliest example of such a divergence, the "ultraviolet catastrophe" first encountered in understanding blackbody radiation. According to classical physics at the end of the nineteenth century, the quantity of radiation in the form of light released at any specific wavelength should increase with decreasing wavelength—in particular, there should be considerably more ultraviolet light released from a blackbody radiator than infrared light. Measurements showed the opposite, with maximal energy released at intermediate wavelengths, suggesting a failure of classical mechanics. This problem eventually led to the development of quantum mechanics.

The successful resolution of the original ultraviolet catastrophe has prompted the pursuit of solutions to other problems of ultraviolet divergence. A similar problem in electromagnetism was solved by Richard Feynman by applying quantum field theory through the use of renormalization, leading to the successful creation of quantum electrodynamics (QED). Similar techniques led to the Standard Model of particle physics. Ultraviolet divergences remain a key feature in the exploration of new physical theories, like supersymmetry.

== Proliferation in perturbative theory ==
Commenting on the fact that contemporary theories about quantum scattering of fundamental particles grew out of application of the quantization procedure to classical fields that satisfy wave equations, J.D. Bjorken and Sidney Drell pointed out the following facts about such a procedure which are still as relevant today as in 1965:

The first is that we are led to a theory with differential wave propagation. The field functions are continuous functions of continuous parameters x and t, and the changes in the fields at a point x are determined by properties of the fields infinitesimally close to the point x. For most wave fields (for example, sound waves and the vibrations of strings and membranes) such a description is an idealization which is valid for distances larger than the characteristic length which measures the granularity of the medium. For smaller distances these theories are modified in a profound way. The electromagnetic field is a notable exception. Indeed, until the special theory of relativity obviated the necessity of a mechanistic interpretation, physicists made great efforts to discover evidence for such a mechanical description of the radiation field. After the requirement of an "ether" which propagates light waves had been abandoned, there was considerably less difficulty in accepting this same idea when the observed wave properties of the electron suggested the introduction of a new field. Indeed there is no evidence of an ether which underlies the electron wave. However, it is a gross and profound extrapolation of present experimental knowledge to assume that a wave description successful at "large" distances (that is, atomic lengths ≈ 10^{−8} cm) may be extended to distances an indefinite number of orders of magnitude smaller (for example, to less than nuclear lengths ≈ 10^{−13} cm). In the relativistic theory, we have seen that the assumption that the field description is correct in arbitrarily small space-time intervals has led—in perturbation theory—to divergent expressions for the electron self-energy and the bare charge. Renormalization theory has sidestepped these divergence difficulties, which may be indicative of the failure of the perturbation expansion. However, it is widely felt that the divergences are symptomatic of a chronic disorder in the small-distance behaviour of the theory. We might then ask why local field theories, that is, theories of fields which can be described by differential laws of wave propagation, have been so extensively used and accepted. There are several reasons, including the important one that with their aid a significant region of agreement with observations has been found. But the foremost reason is brutally simple: there exists no convincing form of a theory which avoids differential field equations.

== See also ==
- Infrared divergence
- Cutoff (physics)
- Renormalization group
- UV fixed point
- Causal perturbation theory
- Zeta function regularization
