= Harry Lehmann =

German physicist (1924–1998)

- Harry Lehmann
- Born: 21 March 1924; Güstrow, Germany
- Died: 22 November 1998 (aged 74); Hamburg, Germany
- Education: Rostock; Humboldt University of Berlin
- Known for: Lehmann rerpresentation LSZ reduction formula
- Awards: Heineman Prize (1997); Max Planck Medal (1967)
- Scientific career
- Fields: Quantum field theory
- Workplaces: Max Planck Institute; University of Copenhagen; University of Hamburg
- Academic advisors: Friedrich Hund

Harry Lehmann (21 March 1924 in Güstrow – 22 November 1998 in Hamburg) was a German physicist. Known for his work on correlation functions in quantum field theory.

== Biography ==
Lehmann studied physics at Rostock and the Humboldt-Universität zu Berlin.

In 1952 he worked at the Max-Planck-Institut in Göttingen, and spent a year in Copenhagen and from 1956 worked in Hamburg.

In 1967 he won the Max Planck Medal for extraordinary achievements in theoretical physics. It is awarded annually by the Deutsche Physikalische Gesellschaft (German: German Physical Society).

He had a strong collaboration with Wolfhart Zimmermann and Kurt Symanzik that led to the development of the Lehmann–Symanzik–Zimmermann reduction formula or LSZ formula after their initials. They were referred as the Field Club (German: Feldverein) by Wolfgang Pauli.

== See also ==
- Edge-of-the-wedge theorem
