= Causal perturbation theory =

Mathematically rigorous approach to renormalization theory

Causal perturbation theory is a mathematically rigorous approach to renormalization theory, which makes it possible to put the theoretical setup of perturbative quantum field theory on a sound mathematical basis. It goes back to a 1973 work by Henri Epstein and Vladimir Jurko Glaser.

== Overview ==
When developing quantum electrodynamics in the 1940s, Shin'ichiro Tomonaga, Julian Schwinger, Richard Feynman, and Freeman Dyson discovered that, in perturbative calculations, problems with divergent integrals abounded. The divergences appeared in calculations involving Feynman diagrams with closed loops of virtual particles. It is an important observation that in perturbative quantum field theory, time-ordered products of distributions arise in a natural way and may lead to ultraviolet divergences in the corresponding calculations. From the generalized functions point of view, the problem of divergences is rooted in the fact that the theory of distributions is a purely linear theory, in the sense that the product of two distributions cannot consistently be defined (in general), as was proved by Laurent Schwartz in the 1950s.

Epstein and Glaser solved this problem for a special class of distributions that fulfill a causality condition, which itself is a basic requirement in axiomatic quantum field theory. In their original work, Epstein and Glaser studied only theories involving scalar (spinless) particles. Since then, the causal approach has been applied also to a wide range of gauge theories, which represent the most important quantum field theories in modern physics.

== Additional reading ==
- Scharf, G (1995). Finite Quantum Electrodynamics : The Causal Approach (2nd ed.). Berlin New York: Springer. ISBN 978-3-540-60142-5. OCLC 32890905.
- Scharf, G (2001). Quantum gauge theories : a true ghost-story (1st ed.). New York: John Wiley & Sons. ISBN 978-0-471-41480-3. OCLC 45394191.
- Dütsch, Michael; Scharf, Günter (1999). "Perturbative gauge invariance: the electroweak theory". Annalen der Physik (in German). 8 (5). Wiley: 359–387. arXiv:hep-th/9612091. Bibcode:1999AnP...511..359D. doi:10.1002/(sici)1521-3889(199905)8:5<359::aid-andp359>3.0.co;2-m. ISSN 0003-3804. S2CID 122295550.
