= Correlation function (quantum field theory) =

Expectation value of time-ordered quantum operators

In quantum field theory, correlation functions, often referred to as correlators or Green's functions, are vacuum expectation values of time-ordered products of field operators. They are a key object of study in quantum field theory where they can be used to calculate various observables such as S-matrix elements, although they are not themselves observables. This is because they need not be gauge invariant, nor are they unique, with different correlation functions resulting in the same S-matrix and therefore describing the same physics. They are closely related to correlation functions between random variables, although they are nonetheless different objects, being defined in Minkowski spacetime and on quantum operators.

== Definition ==
For a scalar field theory with a single field $\phi(x)$ and a vacuum state $|\Omega\rangle$ at every event x in spacetime, the n-point correlation function is the vacuum expectation value of the time-ordered products of n field operators in the Heisenberg picture
$$G_n(x_1,\dots, x_n) = \langle \Omega|T\{\mathcal \phi(x_1)\dots \mathcal \phi(x_n)\}|\Omega\rangle.$$

Here $T\{\cdots \}$ is the time-ordering operator for which orders the field operators so that earlier time field operators appear to the right of later time field operators. By transforming the fields and states into the interaction picture, this is rewritten as
$$G_n(x_1, \dots, x_n) = \frac{\langle 0|T\{\phi(x_1)\dots \phi(x_n)e^{iS[\phi]}\}|0\rangle}{\langle 0|e^{i S[\phi]}|0\rangle},$$
where $|0\rangle$ is the ground state of the free theory and $S[\phi]$ is the action. Expanding $e^{iS[\phi]}$ using its Taylor series, the n-point correlation function becomes a sum of interaction picture correlation functions which can be evaluated using Wick's theorem. A diagrammatic way to represent the resulting sum is via Feynman diagrams, where each term can be evaluated using the position space Feynman rules.

A connected Feynman diagram which contributes to the connected six-point correlation function.

A disconnected Feynman diagram which does not contribute to the connected six-point correlation function.

The series of diagrams arising from $\langle 0|e^{iS[\phi]}|0\rangle$ is the set of all vacuum bubble diagrams, which are diagrams with no external legs. Meanwhile, $\langle 0|\phi(x_1)\dots \phi(x_n)e^{iS[\phi]}|0\rangle$ is given by the set of all possible diagrams with exactly n external legs. Since this sum also includes disconnected diagrams with vacuum bubbles, the numerator factorizes into

(sum over all bubble diagrams)$\times$(sum of all diagrams with no bubbles).

The first factor then cancels with the normalization factor in the denominator meaning that the n-point correlation function is the sum of all Feynman diagrams excluding vacuum bubbles

$$G_n(x_1, \dots, x_n) = \langle 0|T\{\phi(x_1) \dots \phi(x_n)e^{iS[\phi]}\}|0\rangle_{\text{no bubbles}}.$$

While not including any vacuum bubbles, the sum does include disconnected diagrams, which are diagrams where at least one external leg is not connected to all other external legs through some connected path. Excluding these disconnected diagrams instead defines connected n-point correlation functions
$$G_n^c(x_1, \dots, x_n) = \langle 0| T\{\phi(x_1)\dots \phi(x_n) e^{iS[\phi]}\}|0\rangle_{\text{connected, no bubbles}}$$

It is often preferable to work directly with these as they contain all the information that the full correlation functions contain since any disconnected diagram is merely a product of connected diagrams. By excluding other sets of diagrams one can define other correlation functions such as one-particle irreducible correlation functions.

In the path integral formulation, n-point correlation functions are written as a functional average
$$G_n(x_1, \dots, x_n) = \frac{\int \mathcal D \phi \ \phi(x_1) \dots \phi(x_n) e^{iS[\phi]}}{\int \mathcal D \phi \ e^{iS[\phi]}}.$$

They can be evaluated using the partition functional $Z[J]$ which acts as a generating functional, with $J$ being a source-term, for the correlation functions
$$G_n(x_1, \dots, x_n) = (-i)^n \frac{1}{Z[J]} \left.\frac{\delta^n Z[J]}{\delta J(x_1) \dots \delta J(x_n)}\right|_{J=0}.$$

Similarly, connected correlation functions can be generated using $W[J] = -i \ln Z[J]$ (Note: The $-i$ factor in the definition of $W[J]$ is a matter of convention, with the sum of all connected Feynman diagrams instead given by $W'[J]=iW[J]$.) as
$$G_n^c(x_1, \dots, x_n) = (-i)^{n-1} \left.\frac{\delta^n W[J]}{\delta J(x_1) \dots \delta J(x_n)}\right|_{J=0}.$$

== Relation to the S-matrix ==
Scattering amplitudes can be calculated using correlation functions by relating them to the S-matrix through the LSZ reduction formula
$$\langle f|S|i\rangle = \left[i \int d^4 x_1 e^{-ip_1 x_1} \left(\partial^2_{x_1} + m^2\right)\right]\cdots \left[i \int d^4 x_n e^{ip_n x_n} \left(\partial_{x_n}^2 + m^2\right)\right] \langle \Omega |T\{\phi(x_1)\dots \phi(x_n)\}|\Omega\rangle.$$

Here the particles in the initial state $|i\rangle$ have a $-i$ sign in the exponential, while the particles in the final state $|f\rangle$ have a $+i$. All terms in the Feynman diagram expansion of the correlation function will have one propagator for each external leg, that is a propagators with one end at $x_i$ and the other at some internal vertex $x$. The significance of this formula becomes clear after the application of the Klein–Gordon operators to these external legs using
$$\left(\partial^2_{x_i} + m^2\right)\Delta_F(x_i,x) = -i\delta^4(x_i-x).$$

This is said to amputate the diagrams by removing the external leg propagators and putting the external states on-shell. All other off-shell contributions from the correlation function vanish. After integrating the resulting delta functions, what will remain of the LSZ reduction formula is merely a Fourier transformation operation where the integration is over the internal point positions $x$ that the external leg propagators were attached to. In this form the reduction formula shows that the S-matrix is the Fourier transform of the amputated correlation functions with on-shell external states.

It is common to directly deal with the momentum space correlation function $\tilde G(q_1, \dots, q_n)$, defined through the Fourier transformation of the correlation function
$$(2\pi)^4 \delta^{(4)}(q_1+\cdots + q_n) \tilde G_n(q_1, \dots, q_n) = \int d^4 x_1 \dots d^4 x_n \left(\prod^n_{i=1} e^{-i q_i x_i}\right) G_n(x_1, \dots, x_n),$$
where by convention the momenta are directed inwards into the diagram. A useful quantity to calculate when calculating scattering amplitudes is the matrix element $\mathcal M$ which is defined from the S-matrix via
$$\langle f| S - 1 |i\rangle = i(2\pi)^4 \delta^4{\bigg(\sum_i p_i\bigg)} \mathcal M$$
where $p_i$ are the external momenta. From the LSZ reduction formula it then follows that the matrix element is equivalent to the amputated connected momentum space correlation function with properly orientated external momenta
$$i \mathcal M = \tilde G_n^c(p_1, \dots, -p_n)_{\text{amputated}}.$$

For non-scalar theories the reduction formula also introduces external state terms such as polarization vectors for photons or spinor states for fermions. The requirement of using the connected correlation functions arises from the cluster decomposition because scattering processes that occur at large separations do not interfere with each other so can be treated separately.

== See also ==
- Effective action
- Green's function (many-body theory)
- Partition function (mathematics)
- Source field
