= LSZ reduction formula =

Connection between correlation functions and the S-matrix

In quantum field theory, the Lehmann–Symanzik–Zimmermann (LSZ) reduction formula is a method to calculate S-matrix elements (the scattering amplitudes) from the time-ordered correlation functions of a quantum field theory. It is a step of the path that starts from the Lagrangian of some quantum field theory and leads to prediction of measurable quantities. It is named after the three German physicists Harry Lehmann, Kurt Symanzik and Wolfhart Zimmermann.

Although the LSZ reduction formula cannot handle bound states, massless particles and topological solitons, it can be generalized to cover bound states, by use of composite fields which are often nonlocal. Furthermore, the method, or variants thereof, have turned out to be also fruitful in other fields of theoretical physics. For example, in statistical physics they can be used to get a particularly general formulation of the fluctuation-dissipation theorem.

== In and out fields ==
S-matrix elements are probability amplitudes of transitions between in states and out states. An in state $|\{p\}\ \mathrm{in}\rangle$ describes the state of a system of particles which, in a far away past, before interacting, were moving freely with definite momenta {p}, and, conversely, an out state $|\{p\}\ \mathrm{out}\rangle$ describes the state of a system of particles which, long after interaction, will be moving freely with definite momenta {p}.

In and out states are states in Heisenberg picture so they should not be thought to describe particles at a definite time, but rather to describe the system of particles in its entire evolution, so that the S-matrix element:

$$S_{\rm fi}=\langle \{q\}\ \mathrm{out}| \{p\}\ \mathrm{in}\rangle$$

is the probability amplitude for a set of particles which were prepared with definite momenta {p} to interact and be measured later as a new set of particles with momenta {q}.

The way (Note: A pedagogical derivation of the LSZ reduction formula can be found in Peskin and Schroeder, Section 7.2, also in Srednicki, Section I.5, in Weinberg, pp. 436–438, in Ticciati, section 10.5 (using $\varphi^\prime(f,t)$ to denote creation operators), or in lecture notes by Skaar, University of Oslo.) to build in and out states is to seek appropriate field operators that provide the right creation and annihilation operators. These fields are called respectively in and out fields:

Just to fix ideas, suppose we deal with a Klein–Gordon field that interacts in some way:

$$\mathcal L= \frac 1 2 \partial_\mu \varphi\partial^\mu \varphi - \frac 1 2 m_0^2 \varphi^2 +\mathcal L_{\mathrm{int}}$$

$\mathcal L_{\mathrm{int}}$ may contain a self interaction gφ^{3} or interaction with other fields, like a Yukawa interaction $g\ \varphi\bar\psi\psi$. From this Lagrangian, using Euler–Lagrange equations, the equation of motion follows:

$$\left(\partial^2+m_0^2\right)\varphi(x)=j_0(x)$$

where, if $\mathcal L_{\mathrm{int}}$ does not contain derivative couplings:

$$j_0=\frac{\partial\mathcal L_{\mathrm{int}}}{\partial \varphi}$$

We may expect the in field to resemble the asymptotic behaviour of the free field as $x^0 \to -\infty$, making the assumption that in the far away past interaction described by the current j_{0} is negligible, as particles are far from each other. This hypothesis is named the adiabatic hypothesis. However self interaction never fades away and, besides many other effects, it causes a difference between the Lagrangian mass m_{0} and the physical mass m of the φ boson. This fact must be taken into account by rewriting the equation of motion as follows:

$$\left(\partial^2+m^2\right)\varphi(x)=j_0(x)+\left(m^2-m_0^2\right)\varphi(x)=j(x)$$

This equation can be solved formally using the retarded Green's function of the Klein–Gordon operator $\partial^2+m^2$:

$$\Delta_{\mathrm{ret}}(x)=i\theta\left(x^0\right)\int \frac{\mathrm{d}^3k}{(2\pi)^3 2\omega_k} \left(e^{-ik\cdot x}-e^{ik\cdot x}\right)_{k^0=\omega_k}\qquad \omega_k=\sqrt{\mathbf{k}^2+m^2}$$

allowing us to split interaction from asymptotic behaviour. The solution is:

$$\varphi(x)=\sqrt Z \varphi_{\mathrm{in}}(x) +\int \mathrm{d}^4y \Delta_{\mathrm{ret}}(x-y)j(y)$$

The factor $\sqrt{Z}$ is a normalization factor that will come handy later, the field $\varphi_{\mathrm{in}}$ is a solution of the homogeneous equation associated with the equation of motion:

$$\left(\partial^2+m^2\right) \varphi_{\mathrm{in}}(x)=0,$$

and hence is a free field which describes an incoming unperturbed wave, while the last term of the solution gives the perturbation of the wave due to interaction.

The field $\varphi_{\mathrm{in}}$ is indeed the in field we were seeking, as it describes the asymptotic behaviour of the interacting field as $x^0 \to -\infty$, though this statement will be made more precise later. It is a free scalar field so it can be expanded in plane waves:

$$\varphi_{\mathrm{in}}(x)=\int \mathrm{d}^3k \left\{f_k(x) a_{\mathrm{in}}(\mathbf{k})+f^*_k(x) a^\dagger_{\mathrm{in}}(\mathbf{k})\right\}$$

where:

$$f_k(x)=\left.\frac{e^{-ik\cdot x}}{(2\pi)^{\frac{3}{2}}(2\omega_k)^{\frac{1}{2}}}\right|_{k^0=\omega_k}$$

The inverse function for the coefficients in terms of the field can be easily obtained and put in the elegant form:

$$a_{\mathrm{in}}(\mathbf{k})=i\int \mathrm{d}^3x f^*_k(x)\overleftrightarrow{\partial_0}\varphi_{\mathrm{in}}(x)$$

where:

$${\mathrm{g}}\overleftrightarrow{\partial_0} f = \mathrm{g}\partial_0 f -f\partial_0 \mathrm{g}.$$

The Fourier coefficients satisfy the algebra of creation and annihilation operators:

$$[a_{\mathrm{in}}(\mathbf{p}),a_{\mathrm{in}}(\mathbf{q})]=0;\quad [a_{\mathrm{in}}(\mathbf{p}),a^\dagger_{\mathrm{in}}(\mathbf{q})]=\delta^3(\mathbf{p}-\mathbf{q});$$

and they can be used to build in states in the usual way:

$$\left|k_1,\ldots,k_n\ \mathrm{in}\right\rangle=\sqrt{2\omega_{k_1}}a_{\mathrm{in}}^\dagger(\mathbf{k}_1)\ldots \sqrt{2\omega_{k_n}}a_{\mathrm{in}}^\dagger(\mathbf{k}_n)|0\rangle$$

The relation between the interacting field and the in field is not very simple to use, and the presence of the retarded Green's function tempts us to write something like:

$$\varphi(x)\sim\sqrt Z\varphi_{\mathrm{in}}(x)\qquad \mathrm{as}\quad x^0\to-\infty$$

implicitly making the assumption that all interactions become negligible when particles are far away from each other. Yet the current j(x) contains also self interactions like those producing the mass shift from m_{0} to m. These interactions do not fade away as particles drift apart, so much care must be used in establishing asymptotic relations between the interacting field and the in field.

The correct prescription, as developed by Lehmann, Symanzik and Zimmermann, requires two normalizable states $|\alpha\rangle$ and $|\beta\rangle$, and a normalizable solution f (x) of the Klein–Gordon equation $(\partial^2+m^2)f(x)=0$. With these pieces one can state a correct and useful but very weak asymptotic relation:

$$\lim_{x^0\to-\infty} \int \mathrm{d}^3x \langle\alpha|f(x)\overleftrightarrow{\partial_0}\varphi(x)|\beta\rangle= \sqrt Z \int \mathrm{d}^3x \langle\alpha|f(x)\overleftrightarrow{\partial_0}\varphi_{\mathrm{in}}(x)|\beta\rangle$$

The second member is indeed independent of time as can be shown by differentiating and remembering that both $\varphi_{\mathrm{in}}$ and f satisfy the Klein–Gordon equation.

With appropriate changes the same steps can be followed to construct an out field that builds out states. In particular the definition of the out field is:

$$\varphi(x)=\sqrt Z \varphi_{\mathrm{out}}(x) +\int \mathrm{d}^4y \Delta_{\mathrm{adv}}(x-y)j(y)$$

where $\Delta_\mathrm{adv} (x-y)$ is the advanced Green's function of the Klein–Gordon operator. The weak asymptotic relation between out field and interacting field is:

$$\lim_{x^0\to \infty} \int \mathrm{d}^3x \langle\alpha|f(x)\overleftrightarrow{\partial_0}\varphi(x)|\beta\rangle= \sqrt Z \int \mathrm{d}^3x
\langle\alpha|f(x)\overleftrightarrow{\partial_0}\varphi_{\mathrm{out}}(x)|\beta\rangle$$

== The reduction formula for scalars ==
The asymptotic relations are all that is needed to obtain the LSZ reduction formula. For future convenience we start with the matrix element:

$$\mathcal M=\langle \beta\ \mathrm{out}|\mathrm{T}\varphi(y_1)\ldots\varphi(y_n)|\alpha\ \mathrm{in}\rangle$$

which is slightly more general than an S-matrix element. $\mathcal M$ is the expectation value of the time-ordered product of a number of fields $\varphi(y_1)\cdots\varphi(y_n)$ between an out state and an in state. The out state can contain anything from the vacuum to an undefined number of particles, whose momenta are summarized by the index β. The in state contains at least a particle of momentum p, and possibly many others, whose momenta are summarized by the index α. If there are no fields in the time-ordered product, then $\mathcal M$ is obviously an S-matrix element. The particle with momentum p can be 'extracted' from the in state by use of a creation operator:

$$\mathcal M=\sqrt{2\omega_p}\ \left \langle \beta\ \mathrm{out} \bigg| \mathrm T\left[\varphi(y_1)\ldots\varphi(y_n)\right] a_{\mathrm{in}}^\dagger(\mathbf p) \bigg|\alpha'\ \mathrm{in} \right \rangle$$

where the prime on $\alpha$ denotes that one particle has been taken out. With the assumption that no particle with momentum p is present in the out state, that is, we are ignoring forward scattering, we can write:

$$\mathcal M=\sqrt{2\omega_p}\ \left \langle \beta\ \mathrm{out} \bigg|
\left\{
\mathrm T\left[\varphi(y_1)\ldots\varphi(y_n)\right] a_{\mathrm{in}}^\dagger (\mathbf p)- a_{\mathrm{out}}^\dagger(\mathbf p) \mathrm T\left[\varphi(y_1)\ldots\varphi(y_n)\right]
\right\}
\bigg|\alpha'\ \mathrm{in} \right \rangle$$

because $a_{\mathrm{out}}^\dagger$ acting on the left gives zero. Expressing the construction operators in terms of in and out fields, we have:

$$\mathcal M=-i\sqrt{2\omega_p}\ \int \mathrm{d}^3x f_p(x)\overleftrightarrow{\partial_0} \left\langle \beta\ \mathrm{out} \bigg|
\left\{
\mathrm T\left[\varphi(y_1)\ldots\varphi(y_n)\right] \varphi_{\mathrm{in}}(x)- \varphi_{\mathrm{out}}(x) \mathrm T\left[\varphi(y_1)\ldots\varphi(y_n)\right]
\right\}
\bigg|\alpha'\ \mathrm{in}\right \rangle$$

Now we can use the asymptotic condition to write:

$$\mathcal M= -i\sqrt{\frac{2\omega_p}{Z}} \left\{ \lim_{x^0\to-\infty} \int \mathrm{d}^3x f_p(x)\overleftrightarrow{\partial_0} \langle \beta\ \mathrm{out}| \mathrm T\left[\varphi(y_1)\ldots\varphi(y_n)\right] \varphi(x) |\alpha'\ \mathrm{in}\rangle-\lim_{x^0\to\infty} \int \mathrm{d}^3x f_p(x)\overleftrightarrow{\partial_0} \langle \beta\ \mathrm{out}| \varphi(x) \mathrm T\left[\varphi(y_1)\ldots\varphi(y_n)\right] |\alpha'\ \mathrm{in}\rangle \right\}$$

Then we notice that the field φ(x) can be brought inside the time-ordered product, since it appears on the right when x^{0} → −∞ and on the left when x^{0} → ∞:

$$\mathcal M=-i\sqrt{\frac{2\omega_p}{Z}} \left(\lim_{x^0\to-\infty}-\lim_{x^0\to \infty}\right) \int \mathrm{d}^3x f_p(x) \overleftrightarrow{\partial_0} \langle \beta\ \mathrm{out}| \mathrm T\left[\varphi(x)\varphi(y_1)\ldots\varphi(y_n)\right] |\alpha'\ \mathrm{in} \rangle$$

In the following, x dependence in the time-ordered product is what matters, so we set:

$$\langle \beta\ \mathrm{out}| \mathrm T\left[\varphi(x)\varphi(y_1)\ldots\varphi(y_n)\right] |\alpha'\ \mathrm{in}\rangle= \eta(x)$$

It can be shown by explicitly carrying out the time integration that: (Note: Pulling the operators from time-ordering is not entirely trivial since neither $\mathcal \Box+m^2$ nor $\mathcal \int dx^0$ commutes with time-ordering $\mathrm T$. When we apply both the differential and the integral operators, however, the problems cancel out and the combined operator commutes with time-ordering.)

$$\mathcal M=i\sqrt{\frac{2\omega_p}{Z}} \int \mathrm{d}(x^0)\partial_0 \int \mathrm{d}^3x f_p(x)\overleftrightarrow{\partial_0}\eta(x)$$

so that, by explicit time derivation, we have:

$$\mathcal M=i\sqrt{\frac{2\omega_p}{Z}} \int \mathrm{d}^4 x\left\{f_p(x)\partial_0^2\eta(x)-\eta(x)\partial_0^2 f_p(x)\right\}$$

By its definition we see that f_{p} (x) is a solution of the Klein–Gordon equation, which can be written as:

$$\partial_0^2f_p(x)=\left(\Delta-m^2\right) f_p(x)$$

Substituting into the expression for $\mathcal M$ and integrating by parts, we arrive at:

$$\mathcal M=i\sqrt{\frac{2\omega_p}{Z}} \int \mathrm{d}^4 x f_p(x)\left(\partial_0^2-\Delta+m^2\right)\eta(x)$$

That is:

$$\mathcal M=\frac{i}{(2\pi)^{\frac{3}{2}} Z^{\frac{1}{2}}} \int \mathrm{d}^4 x e^{-ip\cdot x} \left(\Box+m^2\right)\langle \beta\ \mathrm{out}| \mathrm T\left[\varphi(x)\varphi(y_1)\ldots\varphi(y_n)\right] |\alpha'\ \mathrm{in}\rangle$$

Starting from this result, and following the same path another particle can be extracted from the in state, leading to the insertion of another field in the time-ordered product. A very similar routine can extract particles from the out state, and the two can be iterated to get vacuum both on right and on left of the time-ordered product, leading to the general formula:

$$\langle p_1,\ldots,p_n\ \mathrm{out}|q_1,\ldots,q_m\ \mathrm{in}\rangle=\int \prod_{i=1}^{m} \left\{\mathrm{d}^4x_i \frac{i e^{-iq_i\cdot x_i} \left(\Box_{x_i}+m^2\right)}{(2\pi)^{\frac{3}{2}} Z^{\frac{1}{2}}}  \right\} \prod_{j=1}^{n} \left\{ \mathrm{d}^4y_j \frac{i e^{ip_j\cdot y_j}\left(\Box_{y_j}+m^2\right)}{(2\pi)^{\frac{3}{2}} Z^{\frac{1}{2}}}  \right\} \langle \Omega|\mathrm{T} \varphi(x_1)\ldots\varphi(x_m)\varphi(y_1)\ldots\varphi(y_n)|\Omega\rangle$$

Which is the LSZ reduction formula for Klein–Gordon scalars. It gains a much better looking form if it is written using the Fourier transform of the correlation function:

$$\Gamma \left (p_1,\ldots,p_n \right )=\int \prod_{i=1}^{n} \left\{\mathrm{d}^4x_i e^{i p_i\cdot x_i} \right\} \langle \Omega|\mathrm{T}\ \varphi(x_1)\ldots\varphi(x_n)|\Omega\rangle$$

Using the inverse transform to substitute in the LSZ reduction formula, with some effort, the following result can be obtained:

$$\langle p_1,\ldots,p_n\ \mathrm{out}|q_1,\ldots,q_m\ \mathrm{in}\rangle= \prod_{i=1}^{m} \left\{-\frac{i\left(p_i^2-m^2\right)}{(2\pi)^{\frac{3}{2}} Z^{\frac{1}{2}}} \right\} \prod_{j=1}^{n} \left\{ -\frac{i\left(q_j^2-m^2\right)}{(2\pi)^{\frac{3}{2}} Z^{\frac{1}{2}}}  \right\} \Gamma \left (p_1,\ldots,p_n;-q_1,\ldots,-q_m \right )$$

Leaving aside normalization factors, this formula asserts that S-matrix elements are the residues of the poles that arise in the Fourier transform of the correlation functions as four-momenta are put on-shell.

== Reduction formula for fermions ==
Recall that solutions to the quantized free-field Dirac equation may be written as

$$\Psi(x)=\sum_{s=\pm}\int\!\mathrm{d}\tilde{p}\big(b^s_\textbf{p}u^s_\textbf{p}\mathrm{e}^{ip\cdot x}+d^{\dagger s}_\textbf{p}v^s_\textbf{p}\mathrm{e}^{-ip\cdot x}\big),$$

where the metric signature is mostly plus, $b^s_\textbf{p}$ is an annihilation operator for b-type particles of momentum $\textbf{p}$ and spin $s=\pm$, $d^{\dagger s}_\textbf{p}$ is a creation operator for d-type particles of spin $s$, and the spinors $u^s_\textbf{p}$ and $v^s_\textbf{p}$ satisfy $(p\!\!\!/+m)u^s_\textbf{p}=0$ and $(p\!\!\!/-m)v^s_\textbf{p} = 0$. The Lorentz-invariant measure is written as $\mathrm{d}\tilde{p}:=\mathrm{d}^3 p/(2\pi)^3 2\omega_\textbf{p}$, with $\omega_\textbf{p} = \sqrt{\textbf{p}^2+m^2}$. Consider now a scattering event consisting of an in state $|\alpha\ \mathrm{in}\rangle$ of non-interacting particles approaching an interaction region at the origin, where scattering occurs, followed by an out state $|\beta\ \mathrm{out}\rangle$ of outgoing non-interacting particles. The probability amplitude for this process is given by

$$\mathcal{M} = \langle \beta\ \mathrm{out}|\alpha\ \mathrm{in}\rangle,$$

where no extra time-ordered product of field operators has been inserted, for simplicity. The situation considered will be the scattering of $n$ b-type particles to $n'$ b-type particles. Suppose that the in state consists of $n$ particles with momenta $\{\textbf{p}_1,...,\textbf{p}_n\}$ and spins $\{s_1,...,s_{n}\}$, while the out state contains particles of momenta $\{\textbf{k}_1,...,\textbf{k}_{n'}\}$ and spins $\{\sigma_1,...,\sigma_{n'}\}$. The in and out states are then given by

$$|\alpha\ \mathrm{in}\rangle = |\textbf{p}_1^{s_1},...,\textbf{p}_n^{s_n}\rangle\quad\text{and}\quad|\beta\ \mathrm{out}\rangle = |\textbf{k}_1^{\sigma_1},...,\textbf{k}_{n'}^{\sigma_{n'}}\rangle.$$

Extracting an in particle from $|\alpha\ \mathrm{in}\rangle$ yields a free-field creation operator $b^{\dagger s_1}_{\textbf{p}_1,\mathrm{in}}$ acting on the state with one less particle. Assuming that no outgoing particle has that same momentum, we then can write

$$\mathcal{M} = \langle\beta\ \mathrm{out}|b^{\dagger s_1}_{\textbf{p}_1,\mathrm{in}}-b^{\dagger s_1}_{\textbf{p}_1,\mathrm{out}}|\alpha'\ \mathrm{in}\rangle,$$

where the prime on $\alpha$ denotes that one particle has been taken out. Now recall that in the free theory, the b-type particle operators can be written in terms of the field using the inverse relation

$$b^{\dagger s}_\textbf{p} = \int\!\mathrm{d}^3 x\;\mathrm{e}^{ip\cdot x}\bar{\Psi}(x)\gamma^0 u^s_\textbf{p},$$

where $\bar{\Psi}(x)=\Psi^\dagger(x)\gamma^0$. Denoting the asymptotic free fields by $\Psi_\text{in}$ and $\Psi_\text{out}$, we find

$$\mathcal{M} = \int\!\mathrm{d}^3x_1\;\mathrm{e}^{ip_1\cdot x_1}\langle\beta\ \mathrm{out}|\bar{\Psi}_\text{in}(x_1)\gamma^0 u^{s_1}_{\textbf{p}_1}-\bar{\Psi}_\text{out}(x_1)\gamma^0 u^{s_1}_{\textbf{p}_1}|\alpha'\ \mathrm{in}\rangle.$$

The weak asymptotic condition needed for a Dirac field, analogous to that for scalar fields, reads

$$\lim_{x^0\rightarrow-\infty}\int\!\mathrm{d}^3 x\langle \beta|\mathrm{e}^{ip\cdot x}\bar{\Psi}(x)\gamma^0 u^{s}_{\textbf{p}}|\alpha\rangle=\sqrt{Z}\int\!\mathrm{d}^3 x\langle \beta|\mathrm{e}^{ip\cdot x}\bar{\Psi}_\text{in}(x)\gamma^0 u^{s}_{\textbf{p}}|\alpha\rangle,$$

and likewise for the out field. The scattering amplitude is then

$$\mathcal{M} = \frac{1}{\sqrt{Z}}\Big(\lim_{x_1^0\rightarrow-\infty}-\lim_{x^0_1\rightarrow+\infty}\Big)\int\!\mathrm{d}^3 x_1\;\mathrm{e}^{ip_1\cdot x_1}\langle\beta\ \mathrm{out}|\bar{\Psi}(x_1)\gamma^0 u^{s_1}_{\textbf{p}_1}|\alpha'\ \mathrm{in}\rangle,$$

where now the interacting field appears in the inner product. Rewriting the limits in terms of the integral of a time derivative, we have

$$\mathcal{M} = -\frac{1}{\sqrt{Z}}\int\!\mathrm{d}^4 x_1\partial_0\big(\mathrm{e}^{ip_1\cdot x_1}\langle\beta\ \mathrm{out}|\bar{\Psi}(x_1)\gamma^0 u^{s_1}_{\textbf{p}_1}|\alpha'\ \mathrm{in}\rangle\big)$$

$$=-\frac{1}{\sqrt{Z}}\int\!\mathrm{d}^4 x_1(\partial_0\mathrm{e}^{ip_1\cdot x_1}\eta(x_1)+\mathrm{e}^{ip_1\cdot x_1}\partial_0\eta(x_1)\big)\gamma^0 u^{s_1}_{\textbf{p}_1},$$

where the row vector of matrix elements of the barred Dirac field is written as $\eta(x_1):=\langle\beta\ \mathrm{out}|\bar{\Psi}(x_1)|\alpha'\ \mathrm{in}\rangle$. Now, recall that $\mathrm{e}^{ip\cdot x}u^s_\textbf{p}$ is a solution to the Dirac equation:

$$(-i\partial\!\!\!/+m)\mathrm{e}^{ip\cdot x}u^s_\textbf{p}=0.$$

Solving for $\gamma^0\partial_0 \mathrm{e}^{ip\cdot x}u^s_\textbf{p}$, substituting it into the first term in the integral, and performing an integration by parts, yields

$$\mathcal{M} = \frac{i}{\sqrt{Z}}\int\!\mathrm{d}^4x_1\mathrm{e}^{ip_1\cdot x_1}\big(i\partial_\mu\eta(x_1)\gamma^\mu + \eta(x_1)m\big)u^{s_1}_{\textbf{p}_1}.$$

Switching to Dirac index notation (with sums over repeated indices) allows for a neater expression, in which the quantity in square brackets is to be regarded as a differential operator:

$$\mathcal{M} = \frac{i}{\sqrt{Z}}\int\!\mathrm{d}^4x_1\mathrm{e}^{ip_1\cdot x_1}[(i{\partial\!\!\!/}_{x_1} + m)u^{s_1}_{\textbf{p}_1}]_{\alpha_1}\langle\beta\ \mathrm{out}|\bar{\Psi}_{\alpha_1}(x_1)|\alpha'\ \mathrm{in}\rangle.$$

Consider next the matrix element appearing in the integral. Extracting an out state creation operator and subtracting the corresponding in state operator, with the assumption that no incoming particle has the same momentum, we have

$$\langle\beta\ \mathrm{out}|\bar{\Psi}_{\alpha_1}(x_1)|\alpha'\ \mathrm{in}\rangle = \langle\beta'\ \mathrm{out}|b^{\sigma_1}_{\textbf{k}_1,\mathrm{out}}\bar{\Psi}_{\alpha_1}(x_1) - \bar{\Psi}_{\alpha_1}(x_1)b^{\sigma_1}_{\textbf{k}_1,\mathrm{in}}|\alpha'\ \mathrm{in}\rangle.$$

Remembering that $(\bar{\Psi}\gamma^0u^s_\textbf{p})^\dagger = \bar{u}^s_\textbf{p}\gamma^0\Psi$, where $\bar{u}^s_\textbf{p}:=u^{\dagger s}_\textbf{p}\beta$, we can replace the annihilation operators with in fields using the adjoint of the inverse relation. Applying the asymptotic relation, we find

$$\langle\beta\ \mathrm{out}|\bar{\Psi}_{\alpha_1}(x_1)|\alpha'\ \mathrm{in}\rangle =\frac{1}{\sqrt{Z}}\Big(\lim_{y^0_1\rightarrow\infty}-\lim_{y^0_1\rightarrow-\infty}\Big)\int\!\mathrm{d}^3 y_1\mathrm{e}^{-ik_1\cdot y_1}[\bar{u}^{\sigma_1}_{\textbf{k}_1}\gamma^0]_{\beta_1}\langle\beta'\ \mathrm{out}|\mathrm{T}[\Psi_{\beta_1}(y_1)\bar{\Psi}_{\alpha_1}(x_1)]|\alpha'\ \mathrm{in}\rangle.$$

Note that a time-ordering symbol has appeared, since the first term requires $\Psi_{\beta_1}(y_1)$ on the left, while the second term requires it on the right. Following the same steps as before, this expression reduces to

$$\langle\beta\ \mathrm{out}|\bar{\Psi}_{\alpha_1}(x_1)|\alpha'\ \mathrm{in}\rangle =\frac{i}{\sqrt{Z}}\int\!\mathrm{d}^4y_1\mathrm{e}^{-ik_1\cdot y_1}[\bar{u}^{\sigma_1}_{\textbf{k}_1}(-i\partial\!\!\!/_{y_1}+m)]_{\beta_1}\langle\beta'\ \mathrm{out}|\mathrm{T}[\Psi_{\beta_1}(y_1)\bar{\Psi}_{\alpha_1}(x_1)]|\alpha'\ \mathrm{in}\rangle.$$

The rest of the in and out states can then be extracted and reduced in the same way, ultimately resulting in

$$\langle \beta\ \mathrm{out}|\alpha\ \mathrm{in}\rangle=\int\!\prod_{j=1}^n \mathrm{d}^4 x_j \frac{i\mathrm{e}^{-ip_j x_j}}{\sqrt{Z}} [(i{\partial\!\!\!/}_{x_j}+m)u^{s_j}_{\textbf{p}_j}]_{\alpha_j}\prod_{l=1}^{n'}\mathrm{d}^4 y_l\frac{i\mathrm{e}^{ik_l y_l}}{\sqrt{Z}}[\bar{u}^{\sigma_l}_{\textbf{k}_l}(-i{\partial\!\!\!/}_{y_l}+m)]_{\beta_l} \langle 0| \mathrm{T}[\Psi_{\beta_1}(y_1)...\Psi_{\beta_{n'}}(y_{n'})\bar{\Psi}_{\alpha_1}(x_1)...\bar{\Psi}_{\alpha_n}(x_n)]|0\rangle.$$

The same procedure can be done for the scattering of d-type particles, for which $u^s_\textbf{p}$'s are replaced by $v^s_\textbf{p}$'s, and $\Psi$'s and $\bar{\Psi}$'s are swapped.

== Field strength normalization ==
The reason of the normalization factor Z in the definition of in and out fields can be understood by taking that relation between the vacuum and a single particle state $|p\rangle$ with four-moment on-shell:

$$\langle 0|\varphi(x)|p\rangle= \sqrt Z \langle 0|\varphi_{\mathrm{in}}(x)|p\rangle + \int \mathrm{d}^4y \Delta_{\mathrm{ret}}(x-y) \langle 0|j(y)|p\rangle$$

Remembering that both φ and φ_{in} are scalar fields with their Lorentz transform according to:

$$\varphi(x)=e^{iP\cdot x}\varphi(0)e^{-iP\cdot x}$$

where P^{μ} is the four-momentum operator, we can write:

$$e^{-ip\cdot x}\langle 0|\varphi(0)|p\rangle= \sqrt Z e^{-ip\cdot x} \langle 0|\varphi_{\mathrm{in}}(0)|p\rangle + \int \mathrm{d}^4y \Delta_{\mathrm{ret}}(x-y)\langle 0|j(y)|p\rangle$$

Applying the Klein–Gordon operator ∂^{2} + m^{2} on both sides, remembering that the four-moment p is on-shell and that Δ_{ret} is the Green's function of the operator, we obtain:

$$0=0 + \int \mathrm{d}^4y \delta^4(x-y) \langle 0|j(y)|p\rangle; \quad\Leftrightarrow\quad \langle 0|j(x)|p\rangle=0$$

So we arrive to the relation:

$$\langle 0|\varphi(x)|p\rangle= \sqrt Z \langle 0|\varphi_{\mathrm{in}}(x)|p\rangle$$

which accounts for the need of the factor Z. The in field is a free field, so it can only connect one-particle states with the vacuum. That is, its expectation value between the vacuum and a many-particle state is null. On the other hand, the interacting field can also connect many-particle states to the vacuum, thanks to interaction, so the expectation values on the two sides of the last equation are different, and need a normalization factor in between. The right hand side can be computed explicitly, by expanding the in field in creation and annihilation operators:

$$\langle 0|\varphi_{\mathrm{in}}(x)|p\rangle= \int \frac{\mathrm{d}^3q}{(2\pi)^{\frac{3}{2}}(2\omega_q)^{\frac{1}{2}}} e^{-iq\cdot x} \langle 0|a_{\mathrm{in}}(\mathbf q)|p\rangle= \int \frac{\mathrm{d}^3q}{(2\pi)^{\frac{3}{2}}} e^{-iq\cdot x} \langle 0|a_{\mathrm{in}}(\mathbf q)a^\dagger_{\mathrm{in}}(\mathbf p)|0\rangle$$

Using the commutation relation between a_{in} and $a^\dagger_{\mathrm{in}}$ we obtain:

$$\langle 0|\varphi_{\mathrm{in}}(x)|p\rangle= \frac{e^{-ip\cdot x}}{(2\pi)^{\frac{3}{2}}}$$

leading to the relation:

$$\langle 0|\varphi(0)|p\rangle= \sqrt \frac{Z}{(2\pi)^3}$$

by which the value of Z may be computed, provided that one knows how to compute $\langle 0|\varphi(0)|p\rangle$.
