= Kurt Symanzik =

German physicist (1923–1983)

- Born: 21 November 1923; Lyck (Ełk), East Prussia
- Died: 25 October 1983 (aged 59); Hamburg, Germany
- Education: Technical University of Munich; University of Göttingen
- Known for: Symanzik improvement Symanzik polymer interpretation Callan–Symanzik equation Lehmann–Symanzik–Zimmerman reduction formula Symanzik polynomials
- Awards: Max Planck Medal (1981)
- Scientific career
- Fields: Quantum field theory
- Workplaces: CERN; Courant Institute; Princeton University
- Academic advisors: Werner Heisenberg

Kurt Symanzik (November 21, 1923 – October 25, 1983) was a German physicist working in quantum field theory.

== Life ==
Symanzik was born in Lyck (today: Ełk), East Prussia, and spent his childhood in Königsberg. He started studying physics in 1946 at Universität München but after a short time moved to Werner Heisenberg at Göttingen. There also the fruitful collaboration with Wolfhart Zimmermann and Harry Lehmann started. In 1954 he earned his PhD for his thesis The Schwinger functional in quantum field theory.

After teaching at Princeton and CERN he gained a full professorship at the New York Courant Institute, which he left 1968 for the Hamburg DESY. He died in Hamburg.

== Work ==
Symanzik is most well known for LSZ reduction formula and the Callan–Symanzik equation.

His early work in non-perturbative quantum field theory together in a circle with other researches nicknamed Feldverein (Field Club) by Wolfgang Pauli led to now classic results. He also contributed to the Euclidean quantum field theory ansatz.

Since 1970 his interests shifted to lattice gauge theory. In 1981 he was awarded the Max Planck medal.

== See also ==
- Schrödinger functional
