= Composite Higgs models =

In particle physics, composite Higgs models (CHM) are speculative extensions of the Standard Model (SM) where the Higgs boson is a bound state of new strong interactions. These scenarios are models for physics beyond the SM presently tested at the Large Hadron Collider (LHC) in Geneva.

In all composite Higgs models the Higgs boson is not an elementary particle (or point-like) but has finite size, perhaps around 10^{−18} meters. This dimension may be related to the Fermi scale (100 GeV) that determines the strength of the weak interactions such as in β-decay, but it could be significantly smaller. Microscopically the composite Higgs will be made of smaller constituents in the same way as nuclei are made of protons and neutrons.

== History ==
Often referred to as "natural" composite Higgs models, CHMs are constructions that attempt to alleviate fine-tuning or "naturalness" problem of the Standard Model. These typically engineer the Higgs boson as a naturally light pseudo-Goldstone boson or Nambu-Goldstone field, in analogy to the pion (or more precisely, like the K-mesons) in quantum chromodynamics. These ideas were introduced by Georgi and Kaplan as a clever variation on technicolor theories to allow for the presence of a physical low mass Higgs boson. These are forerunners of Little Higgs theories.

In parallel, early composite Higgs models arose from the heavy top quark and its renormalization group infrared fixed point, which implies a strong coupling of the Higgs to top quarks at high energies. This formed the basis of top quark condensation theories of electroweak symmetry breaking in which the Higgs boson is composite at extremely short distance scales, composed of a pair of top and anti-top quarks. This was described by Yoichiro Nambu and subsequently developed by Miransky, Tanabashi, and Yamawaki and Bardeen, Hill, and Lindner, who connected the theory to the renormalization group and improved its predictions. While these ideas are still compelling, they suffer from a "naturalness problem", a large degree of fine-tuning.

To remedy the fine tuning problem, Chivukula, Dobrescu, Georgi and Hill introduced the "Top See-Saw" model in which the composite scale is reduced to the several TeV (trillion electron volts, the energy scale of the LHC). A more recent version of the Top Seesaw model of Dobrescu and Cheng has an acceptable light composite Higgs boson. Top Seesaw models have a nice geometric interpretation in theories of extra dimensions, which is most easily seen via dimensional deconstruction (the latter approach does away with the technical details of the geometry of the extra spatial dimension and gives a renormalizable D-4 field theory). These schemes also anticipate "partial compositeness". These models are discussed in the extensive review of strong dynamical theories of Hill and Simmons.

The original minimal top condensation model predicted the Brout-Englert-Higgs boson mass to be about twice the observed value of 125 GeV. However, this was based upon the Nambu-Jona-Lasinio model, which lacks an internal wave-function, $\ \phi(r) ~.$ This becomes a large effect when the coupling constant is near its critical value and must be included. Hill recently reformulated the NJL model, using "bilocal fields" and topcolor, which includes $\ \phi(r)\ ,$ and obtained excellent agreement with the experimental values of the top quark mass and Higgs boson mass (equivalently, the standard model quartic coupling $\ \lambda\$). The theory requires little fine-tuning and predicts new gauge bosons ("colorons") with a mass scale of 5–7 TeV, possibly accessible to the CERN LHC.

CHMs typically predict new particles with mass around a TeV (or tens of TeV as in the Little Higgs schemes) that are excitations or ingredients of the composite Higgs, analogous to the resonances in nuclear physics. The new particles could be produced and detected in collider experiments if the energy of the collision exceeds their mass or could produce deviations from the SM predictions in "low energy observables" – results of experiments at lower energies. Within the most compelling scenarios each Standard Model particle has a partner with equal quantum numbers but heavier mass. For example, the photon, W and Z bosons have heavy replicas with mass determined by the compositeness scale, expected around 1 TeV. Though naturalness requires that new particles exist with mass around a TeV which could be discovered at LHC or future experiments, nonetheless as of 2018, no direct or indirect signs that the Higgs or other SM particles are composite has been detected.

From the LHC discovery of 2012, it is known that there exists a physical Higgs boson (a weak iso-doublet) that condenses to break the electro-weak symmetry. This differs from the prediction ordinary technicolor theories where new strong dynamics directly breaks the electro-weak symmetry without the need of a physical Higgs boson.

The CHM proposed by Georgi and Kaplan was based on known gauge theory dynamics that produces the Higgs doublet as a Goldstone boson. It was later realized, as with the case of Top Seesaw models described above, that this can naturally arise in five-dimensional theories, such as the Randall–Sundrum scenario or by dimensional deconstruction. These scenarios can also be realized in hypothetical strongly coupled conformal field theories (CFT) and the AdS-CFT correspondence. This spurred activity in the field. At first the Higgs was a generic scalar bound state. In the influential work the Higgs as a Goldstone boson was realized in CFTs. Detailed phenomenological studies showed that within this framework agreement with experimental data can be obtained with a mild tuning of parameters.

The more recent work on the holographic realization of CHM, which is based on the AdS/QCD correspondence, provided an explicit realization of the strongly coupled sector of CHM and the computation of meson masses, decay constants and the top-partner mass.

== Examples ==
CHM can be characterized by the mass (m) of the lightest new particles and their coupling (g). The latter is expected to be larger than the SM couplings for consistency. Various realizations of CHM exist that differ for the mechanism that generates the Higgs doublet. Broadly they can be divided in two categories:

1. Higgs is a generic bound state of strong dynamics.
2. Higgs is a Goldstone boson of spontaneous symmetry breaking

In both cases the electro-weak symmetry is broken by the condensation of a Higgs scalar doublet. In the first type of scenario there is no a priori reason why the Higgs boson is lighter than the other composite states and moreover larger deviations from the SM are expected.

=== Higgs as Goldstone boson ===
These are essentially Little Higgs theories. In this scenario the existence of the Higgs boson follows from the symmetries of the theory. This allows to explain why this particle is lighter than the rest of the composite particles whose mass is expected from direct and indirect tests to be around a TeV or higher. It is assumed that the composite sector has a global symmetry G spontaneously broken to a subgroup H where G and H are compact Lie groups. Contrary to technicolor models the unbroken symmetry must contain the SM electro-weak group SU(2)×U(1) . According to Goldstone's theorem the spontaneous breaking of a global symmetry produces massless scalar particles known as Goldstone bosons. By appropriately choosing the global symmetries it is possible to have Goldstone bosons that correspond to the Higgs doublet in the SM. This can be done in a variety of ways and is completely determined by the symmetries. In particular group theory determines the quantum numbers of the Goldstone bosons. From the decomposition of the adjoint representation one finds

$$\ \mathrm{Adj}\bigl[\ G\ \bigr] = \mathrm{Adj}\bigl[\ H\ \bigr] + \mathrm{R}\bigl[\ \Pi\ \bigr]\ ,$$

where R[ Π ] is the representation of the Goldstone bosons under H . The phenomenological request that a Higgs doublet exists selects the possible symmetries. Typical example is the pattern

$$\ \frac{ ~~SO(5) }{\ ~~SU(2)_L \times SU(2)_R\ }\ \longrightarrow\ GB = (2,2)\$$

that contains a single Higgs doublet as a Goldstone boson.

The physics of the Higgs as a Goldstone boson is strongly constrained by the symmetries and determined by the symmetry breaking scale f that controls their interactions. An approximate relation exists between mass and coupling of the composite states, $\ M = g\ f ~.$

In CHM one finds that deviations from the SM are proportional to

$$\ \xi = \frac{~ v^2\ }{~ f^2\ }\ ,$$

where v = 246 GeV is the electro-weak vacuum expectation value. By construction these models approximate the SM to arbitrary precision if ξ is sufficiently small. For example, for the model above with SO(5) global symmetry the coupling of the Higgs to W and Z bosons is modified as

$$\ \frac{ h_\mathsf{VV} }{~ h_\mathsf{VV}^{SM}\ } \approx 1 - \frac{ \xi }{\ 2\ } ~.$$

Phenomenological studies suggest f > 1 TeV and thus at least a factor of a few larger than v . However the tuning of parameters required to achieve v < f is inversely proportional to ξ so that viable scenarios require some degree of tuning.

Goldstone bosons generated from the spontaneous breaking of an exact global symmetry are exactly massless. Therefore, if the Higgs boson is a Goldstone boson the global symmetry cannot be exact. In CHM the Higgs potential is generated by effects that explicitly break the global symmetry G . Minimally these are the SM Yukawa and gauge couplings that cannot respect the global symmetry but other effects can also exist. The top coupling is expected to give a dominant contribution to the Higgs potential as this is the largest coupling in the SM. In the simplest models one finds a correlation between the Higgs mass and the mass M of the top partners,

$$\ m_h^2 \sim \frac{ 3 }{\ 2\ \pi^2\ } \frac{\ M^2\ }{ f^2 }\ v^2\$$

In models with f ~ TeV as suggested by naturalness this indicates fermionic resonances with mass around 1 TeV . Spin-1 resonances are expected to be somewhat heavier. This is within the reach of future collider experiments.

=== Partial compositeness ===
One ingredient of modern CHM is the hypothesis of partial compositeness proposed by D.B. Kaplan. This is similar to a (deconstructed) extra dimension, in which every Standard Model particle has a heavy partner(s) that can mix with it. In practice, the SM particles are linear combinations of elementary and composite states:

$$| \mathsf{Std.Mod.} \rangle ~=~ \cos{\alpha} ~ | \mathsf{Elem.} \rangle + \sin{\alpha} ~ | \mathsf{Comp.} \rangle$$

where $\ \alpha\$ denotes the mixing angle.

Partial compositeness is naturally realized in the gauge sector, where an analogous phenomenon happens quantum chromodynamics and is known as γ–ρ mixing (after the photon and rho meson – two particles with identical quantum numbers which engage in similar intermingling). For fermions it is an assumption that in particular requires the existence of heavy fermions with equal quantum numbers to S.M. quarks and leptons. These interact with the Higgs through the mixing. One schematically finds the formula for the S.M. fermion masses,

$$\frac{\ m_\mathsf{f}\ }{v} ~\approx~ \sin \alpha_\mathsf{L} ~ Y ~ \sin \alpha_\mathsf{R}\ ,$$

where subscripts L and R mark the left and right mixings, and Y is a composite sector coupling.

The composite particles are multiplets of the unbroken symmetry H. For phenomenological reasons this should contain the custodial symmetry SU(2)×SU(2) extending the electro-weak symmetry SU(2)×U(1). Composite fermions often belong to representations larger than the SM particles. For example, a strongly motivated representation for left-handed fermions is the (2,2) that contains particles with exotic electric charge + 5/3 or – 4/3 with special experimental signatures.

Partial compositeness ameliorates the phenomenology of CHM providing a logic why no deviations from the S.M. have been measured so far. In the so-called anarchic scenarios the hierarchies of S.M. fermion masses are generated through the hierarchies of mixings and anarchic composite sector couplings. The light fermions are almost elementary while the third generation is strongly or entirely composite. This leads to a structural suppression of all effects that involve first two generations that are the most precisely measured. In particular flavor transitions and corrections to electro-weak observables are suppressed. Other scenarios are also possible with different phenomenology.

== Experiments ==
The main experimental signatures of CHM are:

1. New heavy partners of Standard Model particles, with SM quantum numbers and masses around a TeV
2. Modified SM couplings
3. New contributions to flavor observables

Supersymmetric models also predict that every Standard Model particle will have a heavier partner. However, in supersymmetry the partners have a different spin: they are bosons if the SM particle is a fermion, and vice versa. In composite Higgs models the partners have the same spin as the SM particles.

All the deviations from the SM are controlled by the tuning parameter ξ. The mixing of the SM particles determines the coupling with the known particles of the SM. The detailed phenomenology depends strongly on the flavor assumptions and is in general model-dependent. The Higgs and the top quark typically have the largest coupling to the new particles. For this reason third generation partners are the most easy to produce and top physics has the largest deviations from the SM. Top partners have also special importance given their role in the naturalness of the theory.

After the first run of the LHC direct experimental searches exclude third generation fermionic resonances up to 800 GeV. Bounds on gluon resonances are in the multi-TeV range and somewhat weaker bounds exist for electro-weak resonances.

Deviations from the SM couplings is proportional to the degree of compositeness of the particles. For this reason the largest departures from the SM predictions are expected for the third generation quarks and Higgs couplings. The first have been measured with per mille precision by the LEP experiment. After the first run of the LHC the couplings of the Higgs with fermions and gauge bosons agree with the SM with a precision around 20%. These results pose some tension for CHM but are compatible with a compositeness scale f~TeV.

The hypothesis of partial compositeness allows to suppress flavor violation beyond the SM that is severely constrained experimentally. Nevertheless, within anarchic scenarios sizable deviations from the SM predictions exist in several observables. Particularly constrained is CP violation in the Kaon system and lepton flavor violation for example the rare decay μ->eγ. Overall flavor physics suggests the strongest indirect bounds on anarchic scenarios. This tension can be avoided with different flavor assumptions.

== Summary ==
The nature of the Higgs boson remains a conundrum. Philosophically, the Higgs boson is either a composite state, built of more fundamental constituents, or it is connected to other states in nature by a symmetry such as supersymmetry (or some blend of these concepts). So far there is no evidence of either compositeness or supersymmetry.

The fact that nature provides a single (weak isodoublet) scalar field that ostensibly uniquely generates fundamental particle masses has yet to be explained.

At present, we have no idea what mass / energy scale will reveal additional information about the Higgs boson that may shed useful light on these issues. While theorists remain busy concocting explanations, this limited insight poses a major challenge to experimental particle physics: We have no clear idea whether feasible accelerators might provide new useful information beyond the S.M. It is hoped that upgrades in luminosity and energy at the LHC may possibly provide new clues.

== See also ==
- Alternatives to the Standard Higgs Model
- Two-Higgs-doublet model
- Preon
