= William A. Bardeen =

American theoretical physicist (1941–2025)

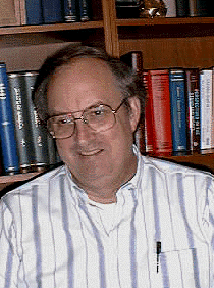
- Born: September 15, 1941; Washington, Pennsylvania, U.S.
- Died: November 18, 2025 (aged 84); Warrenville, Illinois, U.S.
- Education: Cornell University; University of Minnesota
- Known for: Chiral anomaly; Quantum Chromodynamics; Top quark condensate; Chiral symmetry breaking
- Scientific career
- Workplaces: Stony Brook University, Stanford University, Institute for Advanced Study, Fermilab
- Doctoral advisor: Stephen Gasiorowicz

William Allan Bardeen (September 15, 1941 – November 18, 2025) was an American theoretical physicist who worked at the Fermi National Accelerator Laboratory. He is renowned for his foundational work on the chiral anomaly (the Adler-Bardeen theorem), the Yang-Mills and gravitational anomalies, the development of quantum chromodynamics and the $\Lambda_{\overline{MS}}$ scheme frequently used in perturbative analysis of experimentally observable processes such as deep inelastic scattering, high energy collisions and flavor changing processes.

Bardeen also played a major role in developing a theory of dynamical breaking of electroweak symmetry via top quark condensates, leading to the first composite Higgs models. His work on the chiral symmetry breaking dynamics of heavy-light quark bound states correctly predicted abnormally long-lived resonances which are chiral symmetry partners of the ground states, such as the $D_s^*(2317)$. He also developed an analytic, non-perturbative approach for the calculation of non-leptonic decays of Kaons, known as Dual QCD.

He was considered one of the world's leading authorities on quantum field theory in its application to real-world physical phenomena.

== Background ==
Bardeen was born in Washington, Pennsylvania, on September 15, 1941, the son of physicist John Bardeen and Jane Maxwell Bardeen. The family relocated to Champaign-Urbana, Illinois in 1951, where Bardeen attended the University High School. Bardeen met his future wife, Marge, in high school chemistry class. After graduating from Cornell University in 1962, Bardeen earned his Ph.D. degree in physics from the University of Minnesota in 1968. Steve Gasiorowicz was his thesis advisor. Following research appointments at Stony Brook University and the Institute for Advanced Study in Princeton, he was an associate professor in the physics department at Stanford University. In 1975, Bardeen joined the staff of the Fermi National Accelerator Laboratory where he served as Head of the Theoretical Physics Department from 1987-1993 and 1994-1996. From 1993-1994, he was Head of Theoretical Physics at the SSC Laboratory before the project was terminated by act of Congress.

Bardeen lived in Warrenville, Illinois, with his wife Marge, who was manager of the Education Office at Fermilab. He had two grown children: Charles, a retired Project Scientist at the National Center for Atmospheric Research, Boulder, CO, and Karen, who taught chemistry at Oak Park and River Forest High School, Oak Park, Illinois. Bardeen died at his home in Warrenville, Illinois, on November 18, 2025, at the age of 84.

== Scientific contributions ==
Bardeen was co-inventor of the theory of the chiral anomaly, which is of foundational importance in modern theoretical physics. He developed with Stephen L. Adler the "non-renormalization theorem" (known as the Adler–Bardeen theorem). This proves that the anomaly coefficient is not subject to renormalization to all orders in perturbation theory and anticipates the fact that it is associated with topological index theorems.

Bardeen, in a tour de force, computed the full, nontrivial structure of the chiral anomaly in non-abelian Yang-Mills gauge theories. This leads to the distinction between the "consistent anomaly" and the "covariant anomaly." The consistent anomaly is a definition of the loop integrals that satisfies "Wess-Zumino consistency conditions" and is symmetric between left- and right-handed chiral fermions in the Feynman loop. The consistent anomaly is generally related to topology, e.g., the structure and coefficient obtained by Bardeen's calculation turns out to be equivalent to that generated by a topological Chern-Simons term built of Yang-Mills fields in 5 dimensions.

In this work, he introduced the "Bardeen counter-term" which maintains the conservation of the vector current in the definition of the loop integral, and places the anomaly in the axial current. This is known as the "covariant anomaly," and is relevant to physics where the vector current is conserved (and reverts to the Adler result in QED with coefficient increased by a factor of 3 over that of the consistent anomaly). These distinctions are crucial to the Wess-Zumino-Witten term, which is an essential part of chiral Lagrangians, describing the anomalous physics of pseudoscalars and vector mesons, and topological effects in Yang-Mills gauge theories, such as the instanton physics in QCD. With Bruno Zumino, Bardeen formulated the theory of the gravitational anomaly which is of fundamental importance to string theory.

On sabbatical, working at CERN in 1971, Bardeen collaborated with Murray Gell-Mann, Harald Fritzsch, and Heinrich Leutwyler. They considered a gauge theory of quark interactions, in which each quark comes in one of three varieties called "colors". They wrote down the theory now known as quantum chromodynamics (QCD) and, through the chiral anomaly, established the existence of the three quark colors from the rate of $\pi^0$ decay.

With his colleagues, Andrzej Buras, Dennis Duke and Taizo Muta, Bardeen helped to formulate perturbation theory for quantum chromodynamics, introducing the systematic $\Lambda_{\overline{MS}}$ scheme for loop-level perturbation theory, frequently used in the analysis of QCD processes in high energy experiments. With Buras and Jean-Marc Gerard he developed an analytical, non-perturbative framework for the calculation of non-leptonic decays of K-mesons and $\overline{K}K$ mixing. This approach, based on QCD with large$-N_{color}$ led to several results, confirmed by numerical lattice calculation 30 years later. One of these results is the identification of the dominant QCD dynamics responsible for the so-called $\Delta I = 1/2$ rule in $K\rightarrow \pi\pi$ decays, a long-standing puzzle since 1955. With coauthors Sherwin Love and Chung Ngoc Leung, Bardeen also explored theoretical mechanisms for the origin of scale breaking in quantum field theory in conjunction with chiral symmetry breaking and the role of the dilaton.

In the early 1990s, it became clear that the top quark was much heavier than originally anticipated, and that top quarks may be strongly coupled at very short distances. This raised the possibility that pairs of top quarks could form a composite Higgs boson, which led to top quark condensates, and novel dynamical approaches to electroweak symmetry breaking. The theory, developed with Christopher T. Hill and Manfred Lindner, predicted a heavy top quark, governed by the infrared fixed point (about 20% heavier than the observed top quark mass of 175 GeV), but it tended to predict too heavy a Higgs boson, almost twice the observed mass of 125 GeV. The theory has since been improved, with incorporation of the internal wave-function of the bound state, and is now in good agreement with observed Higgs boson properties.

Bardeen and Hill, in 1994, recognized that heavy-light mesons, which contain a heavy quark and a light anti-quark, provide a unique window on the chiral dynamics of a single light quark. They showed that the (spin)^{parity} $(0^-,1^-)$ ground states are split from the $(0^+,1^+)$ parity partners by a universal mass gap of about $~ \Delta M \approx 350 \text{ MeV,}~$ due to the light quark chiral symmetry breaking. This correctly predicted an abnormally long-lived resonance ten years before it was discovered by the BABAR collaboration: the $D_s^*(2317)$. The theory was further developed by Bardeen, Hill and Estia Eichten, and various decay modes were predicted that have been confirmed by experiment. Similar phenomena should be seen in the $B_s$ mesons and $ccq, bcq, bbq$ (heavy-heavy-light baryons).

== Honors ==
Bardeen was elected a Fellow of the American Physical Society in 1984. In 1985, Bardeen was awarded a John S. Guggenheim Memorial Foundation Fellowship for research on the application of quantum field theory to elementary particle physics. Previously, he had received the Senior Scientist Award of the Alexander von Humboldt Foundation and an Alfred P. Sloan Foundation Fellowship for research in theoretical physics. Bardeen was awarded the 1996 J.J. Sakurai Prize of the American Physical Society for his work on anomalies and perturbative quantum chromodynamics. He was elected a Fellow of the American Academy of Arts and Sciences in 1998 and a member of the National Academy of Sciences in 1999.

== Visiting appointments ==
- 1971–72: Visiting Scientist, CERN-TH, Geneva, Switzerland
- 1974: Guest Scientist, Fermi National Accelerator Laboratory
- 1977: Guest Scientist, Max-Planck Institute for Physics, Munich, FRG
- 1985: Visitor, Research Institute for Fundamental Physics, Kyoto, Japan
- 1985: Visitor, Academia Sinica, Beijing, China
- 1985-86: Visitor, The Tata Institute for Fundamental Research, Mumbai, India
- 1986: Visitor, Technion, Haifa, Israel
- 1986: Visiting Scientist, Max-Planck Institute for Physics, Munich, FRG
- 1986: Visiting Professor, University of Paris, Paris, France
- 1997: Visiting Scientist, Max-Planck Institute for Physics, Munich, FRG
- 2007: Visiting Professor, Yukawa Institute of Theoretical Physics, Kyoto, Japan
- 2010: Visiting Professor, University of Valencia, Valencia, Spain
- 2013: Investigator Doctor Senior, University of Valencia, Valencia, Spain
- 2015: Visiting Scientist, University of Valencia, Valencia, Spain

== See also ==
- Anomaly
- Top quark condensates
- Composite Higgs Models
- Chiral symmetry breaking

== Selected publications ==
- Bardeen's publications are available on the INSPIRE-HEP Literature Database .
