= Technicolor (physics) =

Hypothetical model through which W and Z bosons acquire mass

Technicolor theories are models of physics beyond the Standard Model that address electroweak gauge symmetry breaking, the mechanism through which W and Z bosons acquire masses. Early technicolor theories were modelled on quantum chromodynamics (QCD), the "color" theory of the strong nuclear force, which inspired their name.

Instead of introducing elementary Higgs bosons to explain observed phenomena, technicolor models were introduced to dynamically generate masses for the W and Z bosons through new gauge interactions. Although asymptotically free at very high energies, these interactions must become strong and confining (and hence unobservable) at lower energies that have been experimentally probed. This dynamical approach is natural and avoids issues of quantum triviality and the hierarchy problem of the Standard Model.

However, the original models are largely ruled out since experiments in 2012 at CERN's Large Hadron Collider have discovered the mechanism responsible for electroweak symmetry breaking, i.e., the Higgs boson, with mass approximately 125 GeV/c^{2}; such a particle is not generically predicted by technicolor models. Nonetheless, it remains a possibility that the Higgs boson is a composite state, e.g., built of top and anti-top quarks as in the Bardeen–Hill–Lindner theory. Composite Higgs models are generally solved by the top quark infrared fixed point, and may require a new dynamics at extremely high energies such as topcolor.

In order to produce quark and lepton masses, technicolor or composite Higgs models (CHM) have to be "extended" by additional gauge interactions. Particularly when modelled on QCD, extended technicolor was challenged by experimental constraints on flavor-changing neutral current and precision electroweak measurements. The specific extensions of particle dynamics for technicolor or composite Higgs bosons are unknown.

Much technicolor research focuses on exploring strongly interacting gauge theories other than QCD, in order to evade some of these challenges. A particularly active framework is "walking" technicolor, which exhibits nearly conformal behavior caused by an infrared fixed point with strength just above that necessary for spontaneous chiral symmetry breaking. Whether walking can occur and lead to agreement with precision electroweak measurements is being studied through non-perturbative lattice simulations.

== Introduction ==
The mechanism for the breaking of electroweak gauge symmetry in the Standard Model of elementary particle interactions remains unknown. The breaking must be spontaneous, meaning that the underlying theory manifests the symmetry exactly (the gauge-boson fields are massless in the equations of motion), but the solutions (the ground state and the excited states) do not. In particular, the physical W and Z gauge bosons become massive. This phenomenon, in which the W and Z bosons also acquire an extra polarization state, is called the "Higgs mechanism". Despite the precise agreement of the electroweak theory with experiment at energies accessible so far, the necessary ingredients for the symmetry breaking remain hidden, yet to be revealed at higher energies.

The simplest mechanism of electroweak symmetry breaking introduces a single complex field and predicts the existence of the Higgs boson. Typically, the Higgs boson is "unnatural" in the sense that quantum mechanical fluctuations produce corrections to its mass that lift it to such high values that it cannot play the role for which it was introduced. Unless the Standard Model breaks down at energies less than a few TeV, the Higgs mass can be kept small only by a delicate fine-tuning of parameters.

Technicolor avoids this problem by hypothesizing a new gauge interaction coupled to new massless fermions. This interaction is asymptotically free at very high energies and becomes strong and confining as the energy decreases to the electroweak scale of 246 GeV. These strong forces spontaneously break the massless fermions' chiral symmetries, some of which are weakly gauged as part of the Standard Model. This is the dynamical version of the Higgs mechanism. The electroweak gauge symmetry is thus broken, producing masses for the W and Z bosons.

The new strong interaction leads to a host of new composite, short-lived particles at energies accessible at the Large Hadron Collider (LHC). This framework is natural because there are no elementary Higgs bosons and, hence, no fine-tuning of parameters. Quark and lepton masses also break the electroweak gauge symmetries, so they, too, must arise spontaneously. A mechanism for incorporating this feature is known as extended technicolor. Technicolor and extended technicolor face a number of phenomenological challenges, in particular issues of flavor-changing neutral currents, precision electroweak tests, and the top quark mass. Technicolor models also do not generically predict Higgs-like bosons as light as 125 GeV/c^{2}; such a particle was discovered by experiments at the Large Hadron Collider in 2012. Some of these issues can be addressed with a class of theories known as "walking technicolor".

== Early technicolor ==
Technicolor is the name given to the theory of electroweak symmetry breaking by new strong gauge-interactions whose characteristic energy scale Λ_{TC} is the weak scale itself, Λ_{TC} ≈ F_{EW} ≡ 246 GeV . The guiding principle of technicolor is "naturalness": basic physical phenomena should not require fine-tuning of the parameters in the Lagrangian that describes them. What constitutes fine-tuning is to some extent a subjective matter, but a theory with elementary scalar particles typically is very finely tuned (unless it is supersymmetric). The quadratic divergence in the scalar's mass requires adjustments of a part in $\mathcal{O}\left(\frac{M^2_{\mathrm{bare}}}{M^2_{\mathrm{physical}}}\right)$, where M_{bare} is the cutoff of the theory, the energy scale at which the theory changes in some essential way. In the standard electroweak model with M_{bare} ~ 10^{15} GeV (the grand-unification mass scale), and with the Higgs boson mass M_{physical} = 100–500 GeV, the mass is tuned to at least a part in 10^{25}.

By contrast, a natural theory of electroweak symmetry breaking is an asymptotically free gauge theory with fermions as the only matter fields. The technicolor gauge group G_{TC} is often assumed to be SU(N_{TC}). Based on analogy with quantum chromodynamics (QCD), it is assumed that there are one or more doublets of massless Dirac "technifermions" transforming vectorially under the same complex representation of G_{TC}, $T_{i\,\mathrm{L,R}} = ( U_i, D_i)_\mathrm{L,R}\,, \text{ for } i = 1, 2, ..., \tfrac{1}{2} N_\mathrm{f}$. Thus, there is a chiral symmetry of these fermions, e.g., SU(N_{f})_{L} ⊗ SU(N_{f})_{R}, if they all transform according to the same complex representation of G_{TC}. Continuing the analogy with QCD, the running gauge coupling α_{TC}(μ) triggers spontaneous chiral symmetry breaking, the technifermions acquire a dynamical mass, and a number of massless Goldstone bosons result. If the technifermions transform under [SU(2) ⊗ U(1)]_{EW} as left-handed doublets and right-handed singlets, three linear combinations of these Goldstone bosons couple to three of the electroweak gauge currents.

In 1973 Jackiw and Johnson and Cornwall and Norton studied the possibility that a (non-vectorial) gauge interaction of fermions can break itself; i.e., is strong enough to form a Goldstone boson coupled to the gauge current. Using Abelian gauge models, they showed that, if such a Goldstone boson is formed, it is "eaten" by the Higgs mechanism, becoming the longitudinal component of the now massive gauge boson. Technically, the polarization function Π(p^{2}) appearing in the gauge boson propagator,

$$\Delta_{\mu \nu} = \frac{ \left[ \frac{ p_{\mu} p_{\nu} }{p^2} - g_{\mu \nu} \right] }{~p^2 \left[ 1 - g^2 \Pi\left( p^2 \right)\right]~}$$

develops a pole at p^{2} = 0 with residue F^{2}, the square of the Goldstone boson's decay constant, and the gauge boson acquires mass M ≈ g F . In 1973, Weinstein showed that composite Goldstone bosons whose constituent fermions transform in the "standard" way under SU(2) ⊗ U(1) generate the weak boson masses

$$(1)\qquad M_\mathrm{W^\pm} = \frac{1}{2} g\,F_\mathrm{EW} \quad \text{ and } \quad M_\mathrm{Z} = \frac{1}{2}\sqrt{g^2 + {g'}^{2}}F_\mathrm{EW} \equiv \frac{M_\mathrm{W}}{\cos\theta_\mathrm{W}}.$$

This standard-model relation is achieved with elementary Higgs bosons in electroweak doublets; it is verified experimentally to better than 1%. Here, g and g′ are SU(2) and U(1) gauge couplings and $\tan \theta_\mathrm{W} = \frac{g'}{g}$ defines the weak mixing angle.

The important idea of a new strong gauge interaction of massless fermions at the electroweak scale F_{EW} driving the spontaneous breakdown of its global chiral symmetry, of which an SU(2) ⊗ U(1) subgroup is weakly gauged, was first proposed in 1979 by Weinberg. This "technicolor" mechanism is natural in that no fine-tuning of parameters is necessary.

== Extended technicolor ==
Elementary Higgs bosons perform another important task. In the Standard Model, quarks and leptons are necessarily massless because they transform under SU(2) ⊗ U(1) as left-handed doublets and right-handed singlets. The Higgs doublet couples to these fermions. When it develops its vacuum expectation value, it transmits this electroweak breaking to the quarks and leptons, giving them their observed masses. (In general, electroweak-eigenstate fermions are not mass eigenstates, so this process also induces the mixing matrices observed in charged-current weak interactions.)

In technicolor, something else must generate the quark and lepton masses. The only natural possibility, one avoiding the introduction of elementary scalars, is to enlarge G_{TC} to allow technifermions to couple to quarks and leptons. This coupling is induced by gauge bosons of the enlarged group. The picture, then, is that there is a large "extended technicolor" (ETC) gauge group G_{ETC} ⊃ G_{TC} in which technifermions, quarks, and leptons live in the same representations. At one or more high scales Λ_{ETC}, G_{ETC} is broken down to G_{TC}, and quarks and leptons emerge as the TC-singlet fermions. When α_{TC}(μ) becomes strong at scale Λ_{TC} ≈ F_{EW}, the fermionic condensate $\langle \bar{T}T\rangle_\text{TC} \approx 4 \pi F_\text{EW}^3$ forms. (The condensate is the vacuum expectation value of the technifermion bilinear $\bar{T}T$. The estimate here is based on naive dimensional analysis of the quark condensate in QCD, expected to be correct as an order of magnitude.) Then, the transitions $q_\text{L} (\mathrm{ or }\,\,\ell_\text{L}) \rightarrow T_\text{L} \rightarrow T_\text{R} \rightarrow q_\text{R}\,(\mathrm{ or }\,\,\ell_\text{R})$ can proceed through the technifermion's dynamical mass by the emission and reabsorption of ETC bosons whose masses M_{ETC} ≈ g_{ETC} Λ_{ETC} are much greater than Λ_{TC}. The quarks and leptons develop masses given approximately by

$$(2)\qquad m_{q,\ell}(M_\text{ETC}) \approx \frac{g_\text{ETC}^2 \langle \bar T T\rangle_\text{ETC}}{M_\text{ETC}^2} \approx \frac{4 \pi F_\text{EW}^3}{\Lambda_\text{ETC}^2}\,.$$

Here, $\langle \bar T T\rangle_\text{ETC}$ is the technifermion condensate renormalized at the ETC boson mass scale,

$$(3)\qquad \langle \bar T T\rangle_\text{ETC} = \exp{\left(\int_{\Lambda_\text{TC}}^{M_\text{ETC}} \frac{d\mu}{\mu}\gamma_m(\mu)\right)}\,\langle \bar T T\rangle_\text{TC}\,,$$

where γ_{m}(μ) is the anomalous dimension of the technifermion bilinear $\bar T T$ at the scale μ. The second estimate in Eq. (2) depends on the assumption that, as happens in QCD, α_{TC}(μ) becomes weak not far above Λ_{TC}, so that the anomalous dimension γ_{m} of $\bar T T$ is small there. Extended technicolor was introduced in 1979 by Dimopoulos and Susskind, and by Eichten and Lane. For a quark of mass m_{q} ≈ 1 GeV, and with Λ_{TC} ≈ 246 GeV, one estimates Λ_{ETC} ≈ 15 TeV. Therefore, assuming that $g^2_\text{ETC} \gtrsim 1$, M_{ETC} will be at least this large.

In addition to the ETC proposal for quark and lepton masses, Eichten and Lane observed that the size of the ETC representations required to generate all quark and lepton masses suggests that there will be more than one electroweak doublet of technifermions. If so, there will be more (spontaneously broken) chiral symmetries and therefore more Goldstone bosons than are eaten by the Higgs mechanism. These must acquire mass by virtue of the fact that the extra chiral symmetries are also explicitly broken, by the standard-model interactions and the ETC interactions. These "pseudo-Goldstone bosons" are called technipions, π_{T}. An application of Dashen's theorem gives for the ETC contribution to their mass

$$(4)\qquad F_\text{EW}^2 M_{\pi T}^2 \approx \frac{g_\text{ETC}^2 \langle \bar{T}T \bar{T}T\rangle_\text{ETC}}{M_\text{ETC}^2} \approx \frac{16\pi^2 F _{EW}^6}{\Lambda_\text{ETC}^2}\,.$$

The second approximation in Eq. (4) assumes that $\langle \bar{T}T \bar{T}T\rangle_{ETC} \approx \langle \bar{T}T\rangle^2_{ETC}$. For F_{EW} ≈ Λ_{TC} ≈ 246 GeV and Λ_{ETC} ≈ 15 TeV, this contribution to M_{πT} is about 50 GeV. Since ETC interactions generate $m_{q,\ell}$ and the coupling of technipions to quark and lepton pairs, one expects the couplings to be Higgs-like; i.e., roughly proportional to the masses of the quarks and leptons. This means that technipions are expected to predominately decay to the heaviest possible $\bar{q}q$ and $\bar{\ell}\ell$ pairs.

Perhaps the most important restriction on the ETC framework for quark mass generation is that ETC interactions are likely to induce flavor-changing neutral current processes such as μ → e + γ, K_{L} → μ + e, and $\left|\,\operatorname\Delta S \,\right| = 2 \text{ and } \left|\,\operatorname\Delta B' \,\right| = 2$ interactions that induce $\text{K}^0 \leftrightarrow \bar{\text{K}}^0$ and $\text{B}^0 \leftrightarrow \bar{\text{B}}^0$ mixing. The reason is that the algebra of the ETC currents involved in $m_{q,\ell}$ generation imply $\bar{q}q^\prime$ and $\bar{\ell}\ell^\prime$ ETC currents which, when written in terms of fermion mass eigenstates, have no reason to conserve flavor. The strongest constraint comes from requiring that ETC interactions mediating $\text{K} \leftrightarrow \bar{\text{K}}$ mixing contribute less than the Standard Model. This implies an effective Λ_{ETC} greater than 1000 TeV. The actual Λ_{ETC} may be reduced somewhat if CKM-like mixing angle factors are present. If these interactions are CP-violating, as they well may be, the constraint from the ε-parameter is that the effective Λ_{ETC} > 10^{4} TeV. Such huge ETC mass scales imply tiny quark and lepton masses and ETC contributions to M_{πT} of at most a few GeV, in conflict with LEP searches for π_{T} at the Z^{0}.

Extended technicolor is a very ambitious proposal, requiring that quark and lepton masses and mixing angles arise from experimentally accessible interactions. If there exists a successful model, it would not only predict the masses and mixings of quarks and leptons (and technipions), it would explain why there are three families of each: they are the ones that fit into the ETC representations of q, $\ell$, and T. It should not be surprising that the construction of a successful model has proven to be very difficult.

== Walking technicolor ==
Since quark and lepton masses are proportional to the bilinear technifermion condensate divided by the ETC mass scale squared, their tiny values can be avoided if the condensate is enhanced above the weak-α_{TC} estimate in Eq. (2), $\langle\bar{T}T\rangle_\text{ETC} \approx \langle\bar{T}T \rangle_\text{TC} \approx 4 \pi F _\text{EW}^3$.

During the 1980s, several dynamical mechanisms were advanced to do this. In 1981 Holdom suggested that, if the α_{TC}(μ) evolves to a nontrivial fixed point in the ultraviolet, with a large positive anomalous dimension γ_{m} for $\bar{T}T$, realistic quark and lepton masses could arise with Λ_{ETC} large enough to suppress ETC-induced $K \leftrightarrow \bar K$ mixing. However, no example of a nontrivial ultraviolet fixed point in a four-dimensional gauge theory has been constructed. In 1985 Holdom analyzed a technicolor theory in which a "slowly varying" α_{TC}(μ) was envisioned. His focus was to separate the chiral breaking and confinement scales, but he also noted that such a theory could enhance $\langle \bar{T}T\rangle_\text{ETC}$ and thus allow the ETC scale to be raised. In 1986 Akiba and Yanagida also considered enhancing quark and lepton masses, by simply assuming that α_{TC} is constant and strong all the way up to the ETC scale. In the same year Yamawaki, Bando, and Matumoto again imagined an ultraviolet fixed point in a non-asymptotically free theory to enhance the technifermion condensate.

In 1986 Appelquist, Karabali and Wijewardhana discussed the enhancement of fermion masses in an asymptotically free technicolor theory with a slowly running, or "walking", gauge coupling. The slowness arose from the screening effect of a large number of technifermions, with the analysis carried out through two-loop perturbation theory. In 1987 Appelquist and Wijewardhana explored this walking scenario further. They took the analysis to three loops, noted that the walking can lead to a power law enhancement of the technifermion condensate, and estimated the resultant quark, lepton, and technipion masses. The condensate enhancement arises because the associated technifermion mass decreases slowly, roughly linearly, as a function of its renormalization scale. This corresponds to the condensate anomalous dimension γ_{m} in Eq. (3) approaching unity (see below).

In the 1990s, the idea emerged more clearly that walking is naturally described by asymptotically free gauge theories dominated in the infrared by an approximate fixed point. Unlike the speculative proposal of ultraviolet fixed points, fixed points in the infrared are known to exist in asymptotically free theories, arising at two loops in the beta function providing that the fermion count N_{f} is large enough. This has been known since the first two-loop computation in 1974 by Caswell. If N_{f} is close to the value $\hat{N}_\text{f}$ at which asymptotic freedom is lost, the resultant infrared fixed point is weak, of parametric order $\hat{N}_\text{f} - N_\text{f}$, and reliably accessible in perturbation theory. This weak-coupling limit was explored by Banks and Zaks in 1982.

The fixed-point coupling α_{IR} becomes stronger as N_{f} is reduced from $\hat{N}_\text{f}$. Below some critical value N_{fc} the coupling becomes strong enough (> α_{χ SB}) to break spontaneously the massless technifermions' chiral symmetry. Since the analysis must typically go beyond two-loop perturbation theory, the definition of the running coupling α_{TC}(μ), its fixed point value α_{IR}, and the strength α_{χ SB} necessary for chiral symmetry breaking depend on the particular renormalization scheme adopted. For $0 < \frac{\alpha_\text{IR} - \alpha_{\chi \text{SB}}}{\alpha_\text{IR}} \ll 1$; i.e., for N_{f} just below N_{fc}, the evolution of α_{TC}(μ) is governed by the infrared fixed point and it will evolve slowly (walk) for a range of momenta above the breaking scale Λ_{TC}. To overcome the $M_{ETC}^2$-suppression of the masses of first and second generation quarks involved in $K \leftrightarrow \bar{K}$ mixing, this range must extend almost to their ETC scale, of $\mathcal{O}(10^3\hbox{ TeV})$. Cohen and Georgi argued that γ_{m} = 1 is the signal of spontaneous chiral symmetry breaking, i.e., that γ_{m}(α_{χ SB}) = 1. Therefore, in the walking-α_{TC} region, γ_{m} ≈ 1 and, from Eqs. (2) and (3), the light quark masses are enhanced approximately by $\frac{M_\text{ETC}}{\Lambda_\text{TC}}$.

The idea that α_{TC}(μ) walks for a large range of momenta when α_{IR} lies just above α_{χ SB} was suggested by Lane and Ramana. They made an explicit model, discussed the walking that ensued, and used it in their discussion of walking technicolor phenomenology at hadron colliders. This idea was developed in some detail by Appelquist, Terning, and Wijewardhana. Combining a perturbative computation of the infrared fixed point with an approximation of α_{χ SB} based on the Schwinger–Dyson equation, they estimated the critical value N_{fc} and explored the resultant electroweak physics. Since the 1990s, most discussions of walking technicolor are in the framework of theories assumed to be dominated in the infrared by an approximate fixed point. Various models have been explored, some with the technifermions in the fundamental representation of the gauge group and some employing higher representations.

The possibility that the technicolor condensate can be enhanced beyond that discussed in the walking literature, has also been considered recently by Luty and Okui under the name "conformal technicolor". They envision an infrared stable fixed point, but with a very large anomalous dimension for the operator $\bar{T}T$. It remains to be seen whether this can be realized, for example, in the class of theories currently being examined using lattice techniques.

== Top quark mass ==
The enhancement described above for walking technicolor may not be sufficient to generate the measured top quark mass, even for an ETC scale as low as a few TeV. However, this problem could be addressed if the effective four-technifermion coupling resulting from ETC gauge boson exchange is strong and tuned just above a critical value. The analysis of this strong-ETC possibility is that of a Nambu–Jona–Lasinio model with an additional (technicolor) gauge interaction. The technifermion masses are small compared to the ETC scale (the cutoff on the effective theory), but nearly constant out to this scale, leading to a large top quark mass. No fully realistic ETC theory for all quark masses has yet been developed incorporating these ideas. A related study was carried out by Miransky and Yamawaki. A problem with this approach is that it involves some degree of parameter fine-tuning, in conflict with technicolor's guiding principle of naturalness.

A large body of closely related work in which the Higgs is a composite state, composed of top and anti-top quarks, is the top quark condensate, topcolor and top-color-assisted technicolor models, in which new strong interactions are ascribed to the top quark and other third-generation fermions.

== Technicolor on the lattice ==
Lattice gauge theory is a non-perturbative method applicable to strongly interacting technicolor theories, allowing first-principles exploration of walking and conformal dynamics. In 2007, Catterall and Sannino used lattice gauge theory to study SU(2) gauge theories with two flavors of Dirac fermions in the symmetric representation, finding evidence of conformality that has been confirmed by subsequent studies.

As of 2010, the situation for SU(3) gauge theory with fermions in the fundamental representation is not as clear-cut. In 2007, Appelquist, Fleming, and Neil reported evidence that a non-trivial infrared fixed point develops in such theories when there are twelve flavors, but not when there are eight. While some subsequent studies confirmed these results, others reported different conclusions, depending on the lattice methods used, and there is not yet consensus.

Further lattice studies exploring these issues, as well as considering the consequences of these theories for precision electroweak measurements, are underway by several research groups.

== Technicolor phenomenology ==
Any framework for physics beyond the Standard Model must conform with precision measurements of the electroweak parameters. Its consequences for physics at existing and future high-energy hadron colliders, and for the dark matter of the universe must also be explored.

=== Precision electroweak tests ===
In 1990, the phenomenological parameters S, T, and U were introduced by Peskin and Takeuchi to quantify contributions to electroweak radiative corrections from physics beyond the Standard Model. They have a simple relation to the parameters of the electroweak chiral Lagrangian. The Peskin–Takeuchi analysis was based on the general formalism for weak radiative corrections developed by Kennedy, Lynn, Peskin and Stuart, and alternate formulations also exist.

The S, T, and U-parameters describe corrections to the electroweak gauge boson propagators from physics beyond the Standard Model. They can be written in terms of polarization functions of electroweak currents and their spectral representation as follows:

$$\begin{align}
(5)\qquad S &= 16\pi \frac{d}{d q^2} \left[\Pi_{33}^{\mathbf{new}} (q^2) - \Pi_{3Q}^{\mathbf{new}}(q^2)\right]_{q^2=0}\\
&= 4\pi \int\frac{dm^2}{m^4}\left[\sigma^3_V(m^2) - \sigma^3_A(m^2)\right]^{\mathbf{new}};\\
\\
(6)\qquad T &= \frac{16\pi}{M^2_Z \sin^2 2\theta_W}\; \left[\Pi_{11}^{\mathbf{new}}(0) - \Pi_{33}^{\mathbf{new}}(0) \right]\\
&= \frac{4\pi}{M^2_Z \sin^2 2\theta_W}\int_0^\infty\frac{dm^2}{m^2}\left[\sigma_V^1(m^2) + \sigma_A^1(m^2) - \sigma_V^3(m^2) - \sigma_A^3(m^2)\right]^{\mathbf{new}},\end{align}$$

where only new, beyond-standard-model physics is included. The quantities are calculated relative to a minimal Standard Model with some chosen reference mass of the Higgs boson, taken to range from the experimental lower bound of 117 GeV to 1000 GeV where its width becomes very large. For these parameters to describe the dominant corrections to the Standard Model, the mass scale of the new physics must be much greater than M_{W} and M_{Z}, and the coupling of quarks and leptons to the new particles must be suppressed relative to their coupling to the gauge bosons. This is the case with technicolor, so long as the lightest technivector mesons, ρ_{T} and a_{T}, are heavier than 200–300 GeV. The S-parameter is sensitive to all new physics at the TeV scale, while T is a measure of weak-isospin breaking effects. The U-parameter is generally not useful; most new-physics theories, including technicolor theories, give negligible contributions to it.

The S and T-parameters are determined by global fit to experimental data including Z-pole data from LEP at CERN, top quark and W-mass measurements at Fermilab, and measured levels of atomic parity violation. The resultant bounds on these parameters are given in the Review of Particle Properties. Assuming U = 0, the S and T parameters are small and, in fact, consistent with zero:

$$(7)\qquad\begin{align}
S &= -0.04 \pm 0.09\,(-0.07), \\
T &= 0.02 \pm 0.09\,( +0.09),
\end{align}$$

where the central value corresponds to a Higgs mass of 117 GeV and the correction to the central value when the Higgs mass is increased to 300 GeV is given in parentheses. These values place tight restrictions on beyond-standard-model theories – when the relevant corrections can be reliably computed.

The S parameter estimated in QCD-like technicolor theories is significantly greater than the experimentally allowed value. The computation was done assuming that the spectral integral for S is dominated by the lightest ρ_{T} and a_{T} resonances, or by scaling effective Lagrangian parameters from QCD. In walking technicolor, however, the physics at the TeV scale and beyond must be quite different from that of QCD-like theories. In particular, the vector and axial-vector spectral functions cannot be dominated by just the lowest-lying resonances. It is unknown whether higher energy contributions to $\sigma_\text{V,A}^3$ are a tower of identifiable ρ_{T} and a_{T} states or a smooth continuum. It has been conjectured that ρ_{T} and a_{T} partners could be more nearly degenerate in walking theories (approximate parity doubling), reducing their contribution to S. Lattice calculations are underway or planned to test these ideas and obtain reliable estimates of S in walking theories.

The restriction on the T-parameter poses a problem for the generation of the top-quark mass in the ETC framework. The enhancement from walking can allow the associated ETC scale to be as large as a few TeV, but – since the ETC interactions must be strongly weak-isospin breaking to allow for the large top-bottom mass splitting – the contribution to the T parameter, as well as the rate for the decay $\mathrm{Z^0 \rightarrow \bar{b}b}$, could be too large.

=== Hadron collider phenomenology ===
Early studies generally assumed the existence of just one electroweak doublet of technifermions, or of one techni-family including one doublet each of color-triplet techniquarks and color-singlet technileptons (four electroweak doublets in total). The number N_{D} of electroweak doublets determines the decay constant F needed to produce the correct electroweak scale, as F = F_{EW}/√N_{D} = (246 GeV)/√N_{D} . In the minimal, one-doublet model, three Goldstone bosons (technipions, π_{T}) have decay constant F = F_{EW} = 246 GeV and are eaten by the electroweak gauge bosons. The most accessible collider signal is the production through $\bar{q}q$ annihilation in a hadron collider of spin-one $\mathrm \rho_\text{T}^{\pm,0}$, and their subsequent decay into a pair of longitudinally polarized weak bosons, $\mathrm W_\text{LP}^\pm \mathrm Z_\text{LP}^0$ and $\mathrm W_\text{LP}^+ \mathrm W_\text{LP}^-$. At an expected mass of 1.5–2.0 TeV and width of 300–400 GeV, such ρ_{T}'s would be difficult to discover at the LHC. A one-family model has a large number of physical technipions, with F = F_{EW}/√4 = 123 GeV. There is a collection of correspondingly lower-mass color-singlet and octet technivectors decaying into technipion pairs. The π_{T}'s are expected to decay to the heaviest possible quark and lepton pairs. Despite their lower masses, the ρ_{T}'s are wider than in the minimal model and the backgrounds to the π_{T} decays are likely to be insurmountable at a hadron collider.

This picture changed with the advent of walking technicolor. A walking gauge coupling occurs if α_{χ SB} lies just below the IR fixed point value α_{IR}, which requires either a large number of electroweak doublets in the fundamental representation of the gauge group, e.g., or a few doublets in higher-dimensional TC representations. In the latter case, the constraints on ETC representations generally imply other technifermions in the fundamental representation as well. In either case, there are technipions π_{T} with decay constant $F \ll F_{EW}$. This implies $\Lambda_{TC} \ll F_{EW}$ so that the lightest technivectors accessible at the LHC – ρ_{T}, ω_{T}, a_{T} (with I^{G} J^{P C} = 1^{+} 1^{−−}, 0^{−} 1^{−−}, 1^{−} 1^{++}) – have masses well below a TeV. The class of theories with many technifermions and thus $F \ll F_{EW}$ is called low-scale technicolor.

A second consequence of walking technicolor concerns the decays of the spin-one technihadrons. Since technipion masses $M_{\pi_T}^2 \propto \langle\bar{T}T \bar{T}T\rangle_{M_{ETC}}$ (see Eq. (4)), walking enhances them much more than it does other technihadron masses. Thus, it is very likely that the lightest M_{ρ_{T}} < 2M_{π_{T}} and that the two and three-π_{T} decay channels of the light technivectors are closed. This further implies that these technivectors are very narrow. Their most probable two-body channels are $\mathrm W^{\pm,0}_\mathrm L \mathrm \pi_T$, W_{L} W_{L}, γ π_{T} and γ W_{L}. The coupling of the lightest technivectors to W_{L} is proportional to F/F_{EW}. Thus, all their decay rates are suppressed by powers of $\left[\frac{F}{F_{EW}}\right]^2 \ll 1$ or the fine-structure constant, giving total widths of a few GeV (for ρ_{T}) to a few tenths of a GeV (for ω_{T} and _{T}).

A more speculative consequence of walking technicolor is motivated by consideration of its contribution to the S-parameter. As noted above, the usual assumptions made to estimate S_{TC} are invalid in a walking theory. In particular, the spectral integrals used to evaluate S_{TC} cannot be dominated by just the lowest-lying ρ_{T} and a_{T} and, if S_{TC} is to be small, the masses and weak-current couplings of the ρ_{T} and a_{T} could be more nearly equal than they are in QCD.

Low-scale technicolor phenomenology, including the possibility of a more parity-doubled spectrum, has been developed into a set of rules and decay amplitudes. An April 2011 announcement of an excess in jet pairs produced in association with a W boson measured at the Tevatron has been interpreted by Eichten, Lane and Martin as a possible signal of the technipion of low-scale technicolor.

The general scheme of low-scale technicolor makes little sense if the limit on $M_{\rho_{T}}$ is pushed past about 700 GeV. The LHC should be able to discover it or rule it out. Searches there involving decays to technipions and thence to heavy quark jets are hampered by backgrounds from $\bar{t}t$ production; its rate is 100 times larger than that at the Tevatron. Consequently, the discovery of low-scale technicolor at the LHC relies on all-leptonic final-state channels with favorable signal-to-background ratios: $\rho_{T}^{\pm} \rightarrow W_L^\pm Z_L^0$, $a_{T}^{\pm} \rightarrow \gamma W_L^\pm$ and $\omega_{T} \rightarrow \gamma Z_L^0$.

=== Dark matter ===
Technicolor theories naturally contain dark matter candidates. Almost certainly, models can be built in which the lowest-lying technibaryon, a technicolor-singlet bound state of technifermions, is stable enough to survive the evolution of the universe. If the technicolor theory is low-scale ($F \ll F_{EW}$), the baryon's mass should be no more than 1–2 TeV. If not, it could be much heavier. The technibaryon must be electrically neutral and satisfy constraints on its abundance. Given the limits on spin-independent dark-matter-nucleon cross sections from dark-matter search experiments ($\lesssim 10^{-42}\,\mathrm{cm}^2$ for the masses of interest), it may have to be electroweak neutral (weak isospin T_{3} = 0) as well. These considerations suggest that the "old" technicolor dark matter candidates may be difficult to produce at the LHC.

A different class of technicolor dark matter candidates light enough to be accessible at the LHC was introduced by Francesco Sannino and his collaborators. These states are pseudo Goldstone bosons possessing a global charge that makes them stable against decay.

== See also ==
- Higgsless model
- Topcolor
- Top quark condensate
- Infrared fixed point
