= Little Higgs =

In particle physics, little Higgs models are based on the idea that the Higgs boson is a pseudo-Goldstone boson arising from some global symmetry breaking at a TeV energy scale. The goal of little Higgs models is to use the spontaneous breaking of such approximate global symmetries to stabilize the mass of the Higgs boson(s) responsible for electroweak symmetry breaking.

The little Higgs models predict a naturally-light Higgs particle.

== Loop cancellation ==
The main idea behind the little Higgs models is that the one-loop contribution to the tachyonic Higgs boson mass coming from the top quark cancels. (Note: Other one-loop contributions are small enough that they don't really matter: The Yukawa coupling of the top quark is enormous because of its huge mass, and all the other fermions' Yukawa couplings and gauge couplings are negligible by comparison.) The simplified reason for that cancellation is that a loop's contribution is proportional to the coupling constant of one of the SU(2) groups. Because of the symmetries in the theory, the contributions cancel until there is a two-loop contribution involving both groups. This restricts the Higgs boson mass for about one order of magnitude, which is good enough to evade many of the precision electroweak constraints.

== History ==
Little Higgs theories were an outgrowth of dimensional deconstruction: In these theories, the gauge group has the form of a direct product of several copies of the same factor, for example SU(2) × SU(2). Each SU(2) factor may be visualized as the SU(2) group living at a particular point along an additional dimension of space. Consequently, many virtues of extra-dimensional theories are reproduced even though the little Higgs theory is 3+1 dimensional.

Although the idea was first suggested in the 1970s, a viable model was only constructed by Nima Arkani-Hamed, Andrew G. Cohen, and Howard Georgi in 2001. The idea was explored further by Arkani-Hamed, Cohen, Thomas Gregoire, and Jay G. Wacker in 2002. Also in 2002, several other papers appeared that refined the ideas of little Higgs theories, notably the Littlest Higgs by Arkani-Hamed, Cohen, Emanuel Katz, and Ann Nelson.

== See also ==
- Composite Higgs models
- Two-Higgs-doublet model
- Higgsino
