= Christopher T. Hill =

American theoretical physicist

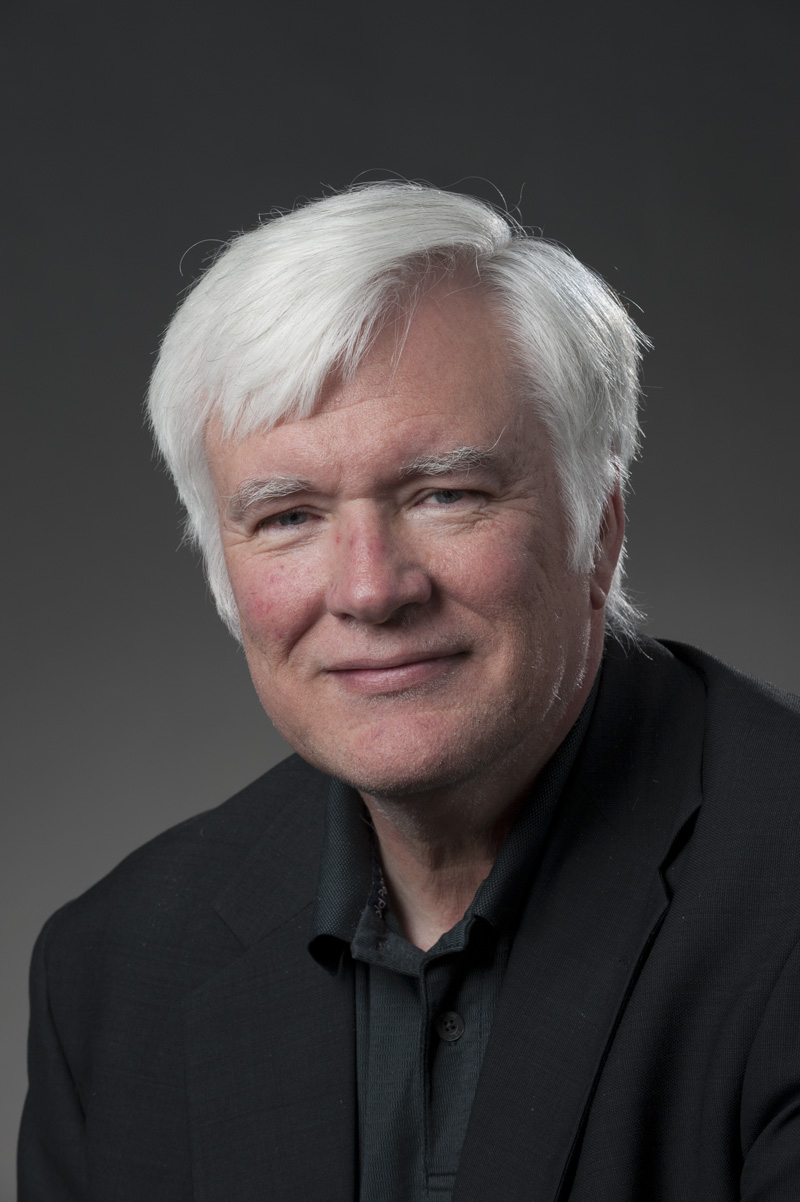
- Born: June 19, 1951 (age 75); Neenah, Wisconsin
- Education: Massachusetts Institute of Technology (BS, MS); California Institute of Technology (PhD)
- Known for: Infrared fixed point of the top quark; Topcolor; Top quark condensate; Dimensional deconstruction; Chiral symmetry breaking in Heavy-Light Mesons; Theory of UHE Cosmic Rays; Soft Nambu-Goldstone Boson model of Dark Matter.
- Scientific career
- Workplaces: Fermilab
- Thesis: Higgs scalars and the nonleptonic weak interactions (1977)
- Doctoral advisor: Murray Gell-Mann

Christopher T. Hill (born June 19, 1951) is a theoretical physicist, formerly of the Fermi National Accelerator Laboratory, who did undergraduate work in physics at M.I.T. (B.S., M.S., 1972), and graduate work at Caltech (Ph.D., 1977, Murray Gell-Mann). His work mainly focuses on new physics that can be probed in laboratory experiments or cosmology.

Hill is an originator, with William A. Bardeen and Manfred Lindner, of the idea that the (Brout-Englert-Higgs) Higgs boson is composed of top and anti-top quarks. This emerges from the concept of the top quark infrared fixed point, with which Hill predicted (1981) that the top quark would be very heavy, contrary to most popular ideas at the time. The fixed point prediction lies within 20% of the observed top quark mass (1995). This implied that the top quarks may be strongly coupled at very short distances and could form a composite Brout-Englert-Higgs boson, which led to top quark condensates, topcolor, and dimensional deconstruction, a renormalizable lattice description of extra dimensions of space.

The original minimal top condensation model predicted the Brout-Englert-Higgs boson mass to be about twice the observed value of 125 GeV. However, this was based upon the Nambu-Jona-Lasinio model, which lacks an internal wave-function, $\phi(r)$, which becomes a large effect when the coupling constant is near its critical value and must be included. Hill has reformulated the NJL model, using "bilocal fields" and "topcolor," which includes $\phi(r)$. In this theory the $\bar{t}t$ boundstates act as relativistic ``Cooper pairs" with extended wave-functions, and the vacuum becomes the analogue of a relativistically generalized BCS state. This yields excellent agreement with the experimental values of the top quark mass and BEH boson mass (equivalently, the standard model quartic coupling $\lambda$). The theory is manifesty Lorentz invariant and requires very little (few percent) fine-tuning. It predicts new gauge bosons ("colorons" ) with a mass scale of about 6 TeV, possibly accessible to the CERN LHC.

Hill coauthored (with Elizabeth H. Simmons) a comprehensive review of strong dynamical theories and electroweak symmetry breaking that has shaped many of the experimental searches for new physics at the Tevatron and LHC.

Heavy-light mesons contain a heavy quark and a light anti-quark, and provide a unique window on the chiral symmetry dynamics of a single light quark. These systems can be viewed as a ball tethered to a pole, where the "pole" is the stationary heavy quark, the "ball" is the single light quark and the "tether" is the gluonic interaction binding them. Hill and Bardeen showed that the (spin)$^{parity}$ $(0^-,1^-)$ ground states are split from $(0^+,1^+)$ "chiral partners" by a universal mass gap of about $~ \Delta M \approx 350 \text{ MeV,}~$ due to the light quark chiral symmetry breaking. The main decay mode of the excited state to the ground state in (heavy)-strange mesons is blocked by the kaon mass, and this correctly predicted the abnormally long-lived resonance, the $D_{s0^+}^*(2317)$ (and the now confirmed $D_{s1^+}^*(2460)$ and $B_{s0^+}^*(5700)$ in the b-quark sector), ten years before its discovery. The theory was expanded in collaboration with Eichten and numerous decay modes were predicted which have been confirmed by experiment. Similar phenomena should be seen in the analogous $B_s$ mesons and $ccs, bcs, bbs$ (heavy-heavy-strange baryons).

Hill is a contributor to the theory of topological interactions and, with collaborators, was first to obtain the full Wess-Zumino-Witten term for the standard model which describes the physics of the chiral anomaly in Lagrangians, including pseudoscalars, spin-1 vector mesons, and the $W^\pm$ and $Z^0$. The WZW term requires a non-trivial counter-term to map the "consistent" anomaly into the "covariant" anomaly, as dictated by the conserved currents of the standard model. With the full WZW-term, new anomalous interactions were revealed such as the $\gamma\omega Z^0$ vertex. This leads to $\nu + X \rightarrow \nu+ \gamma + X$ where $X$ is a heavy nucleus, and may contribute to excess photons seen in low energy neutrino experiments. The result reproduces B+L violation by the anomaly in the standard model, and predicts numerous other anomalous processes. Hill has given a derivation of the coefficients of consistent and covariant chiral anomalies (even D), and Chern-Simons terms (odd D), without resorting to fermion loops, from the Dirac monopole construction and its generalization ("Dirac Branes") to higher dimensions.

Hill is an originator of cosmological models of dark energy and dark matter based upon ultra-low mass pseudo-Nambu-Goldstone bosons associated with symmetries of neutrino masses. He proposed that the cosmological constant is connected to the neutrino mass, as $\Lambda\sim m_\nu^4$ and developed modern theories of the origin of ultra-high-energy nucleons and neutrinos from grand unification relics. He has shown that a cosmic axion field will induce an effective oscillating electric dipole moment for any magnet.

In an unpublished talk at the Vancouver Workshop on Quantum Cosmology (May, 1990), Hill discussed possible roles for Nambu-Goldstone bosons in cosmology and suggested that a pseudo-Nambu-Goldstone boson might provide a "natural inflaton," the particle responsible for cosmic inflation. He noted that this required a spontaneously broken global symmetry, such as U(1), near the Planck scale, and explicit symmetry breaking near the Grand Unification Scale. However, recent work on Weyl invariant theories offers a better rationale for a natural inflation scenario connected to Planck scale physics. With Graham Ross and Pedro G. Ferreira, Hill focused on spontaneously broken scale symmetry (or Weyl symmetry), where the scale of gravity (Planck mass) and the inflationary phase of the ultra-early universe are generated together as a unified phenomenon. This involves a novel symmetry breaking mechanism dubbed "inertial symmetry breaking." The Weyl symmetry breaking occurs because the Noether current is the derivative of a scalar operator, called the "kernal." The current red-shifts to zero, hence the kernal approaches a constant value which determines the Planck mass. The Einstein-Hilbert action of General Relativity is then emergent. The theory is in good agreement with cosmological observation.

== Academic Positions and Honors ==
- Distinguished Scientist at Fermilab (1979 - 2024);
- Head of the Fermilab Theoretical Physics Department (2005 - 2012);
- Visiting Scientist, CERN-TH, Geneva, Switzerland (1987-1988);
- Fellow of the American Physical Society (elected, 1989);
- Arthur H. Compton Lecturer, University of Chicago, Spring (1979);
- Visiting Scholar, Oxford University (1980);
- Professor of Physics (adjunct), University of Chicago, (1996–2000);
- Gambrinus Fellow, University of Dortmund, (2005);
- van Winter Lecturer, University of Kentucky (2009);
- Visiting Professor, Institut de Fisica Corpuscular, Valencia, Spain (2019)
- Honorary Fellow, University of Wisconsin, Madison (2024–present).

== Books and Articles ==
Hill has authored three popular books with Nobel laureate Leon Lederman about physics and cosmology, and the commissioning of the Large Hadron Collider.

- Symmetry and the Beautiful Universe, Christopher T. Hill and Leon M. Lederman, Prometheus Books (2005)
- Quantum Physics for Poets, Christopher T. Hill and Leon M. Lederman, Prometheus Books (2010)
- Beyond the God Particle, Christopher T. Hill and Leon M. Lederman, Prometheus Books (2013).
- Google Scholar Profile of Christopher T. Hill .
