= Two-Higgs-doublet model =

Extension of the Standard Model of particle physics

The two-Higgs-doublet model (2HDM) is an extension of the Standard Model of particle physics. 2HDM models are one of the natural choices for beyond-SM models containing two Higgs doublets instead of just one. There are also models with more than two Higgs doublets, for example three-Higgs-doublet models etc.

The addition of the second Higgs doublet leads to a richer phenomenology as there are five physical scalar states viz., the CP even neutral Higgs bosons h and H (where H is heavier than h by convention), the CP odd pseudoscalar A and two charged Higgs bosons H^{±}. The discovered Higgs boson is measured to be CP even, so one can map either h or H with the observed Higgs.

Such a model can be described in terms of six physical parameters: four Higgs masses ($m_{\rm h}, m_{\rm H}, m_{\rm A}, m_{\mathrm{H}^\pm}$), the ratio of the two vacuum expectation values ($\tan \beta$) and the mixing angle ($\alpha$) which diagonalizes the mass matrix of the neutral CP even Higgses. The SM uses only 2 parameters: the mass of the Higgs and its vacuum expectation value.

A special case occurs when $\cos(\beta - \alpha) \rightarrow 0$, the alignment limit, in which the lighter CP even Higgs boson h has couplings exactly like the SM-Higgs boson. In another limit such limit, where $\sin(\beta - \alpha) \rightarrow 0$, the heavier CP even boson, i.e. H is SM-like, leaving h to be the lighter than the discovered Higgs; however, experiments have strongly pointed towards a value for $\sin(\beta - \alpha)$ that is close to 1.

The masses of the H and A bosons could be below 1 TeV and the CMS experiment has conducted searches around this range but no significant excess above the standard model prediction has been observed.

== Classification ==
Two-Higgs-doublet models can introduce flavor-changing neutral currents which have not been observed so far. The Glashow-Weinberg condition, requiring that each group of fermions (up-type quarks, down-type quarks and charged leptons) couples exactly to one of the two doublets, is sufficient to avoid the prediction of flavor-changing neutral currents.

Depending on which type of fermions couples to which doublet $\Phi$, one can divide two-Higgs-doublet models into the following classes:

Type	Description	up-type quarks couple to	down-type quarks couple to	charged leptons couple to	remarks
Type I	Fermiophobic	$\Phi_2$	$\Phi_2$	$\Phi_2$	charged fermions only couple to second doublet
Type II	MSSM-like	$\Phi_2$	$\Phi_1$	$\Phi_1$	up- and down-type quarks couple to separate doublets
X	Lepton-specific	$\Phi_2$	$\Phi_2$	$\Phi_1$	
Y	Flipped	$\Phi_2$	$\Phi_1$	$\Phi_2$	
Type III		$\Phi_1, \Phi_2$	$\Phi_1, \Phi_2$	$\Phi_1, \Phi_2$	Flavor-changing neutral currents at tree level
Type FCNC-free		$\Phi_1, \Phi_2$	$\Phi_1, \Phi_2$	$\Phi_1, \Phi_2$	By finding a matrix pair which can be diagonalized simultaneously.

By convention, $\Phi_2$ is the doublet to which up-type quarks couple.

== See also ==
- Alternatives to the Standard Model Higgs
- Composite Higgs models
- Preon
