= Alternatives to the Standard Higgs Model =

Alternative models to the Standard Higgs Model are models which are considered by many particle physicists to solve some of the Higgs boson's existing problems. Two of the most currently researched models are quantum triviality, and Higgs hierarchy problem.

== Overview ==
In particle physics, elementary particles and forces give rise to the world around us. Physicists explain the behaviours of these particles and how they interact using the Standard Model—a widely accepted framework believed to explain most of the world we see around us. Initially, when these models were being developed and tested, it seemed that the mathematics behind those models, which were satisfactory in areas already tested, would also forbid elementary particles from having any mass, which showed clearly that these initial models were incomplete. In 1964 three groups of physicists almost simultaneously released papers describing how masses could be given to these particles, using approaches known as symmetry breaking. This approach allowed the particles to obtain a mass, without breaking other parts of particle physics theory that were already believed reasonably correct. This idea became known as the Higgs mechanism, and later experiments confirmed that such a mechanism does exist—but they could not show exactly how it happens.

The simplest theory for how this effect takes place in nature, and the theory that became incorporated into the Standard Model, was that if one or more of a particular kind of "field" (known as a Higgs field) happened to permeate space, and if it could interact with elementary particles in a particular way, then this would give rise to a Higgs mechanism in nature. In the basic Standard Model there is one field and one related Higgs boson; in some extensions to the Standard Model there are multiple fields and multiple Higgs bosons.

In the years since the Higgs field and boson were proposed as a way to explain the origins of symmetry breaking, several alternatives have been proposed that suggest how a symmetry breaking mechanism could occur without requiring a Higgs field to exist. Models which do not include a Higgs field or a Higgs boson are known as Higgsless models. In these models, strongly interacting dynamics rather than an additional (Higgs) field produce the non-zero vacuum expectation value that breaks electroweak symmetry.

== List of alternative models ==
A partial list of proposed alternatives to a Higgs field as a source for symmetry breaking includes:

- Technicolor models break electroweak symmetry through new gauge interactions, which were originally modelled on quantum chromodynamics.
- Extra-dimensional Higgsless models use the fifth component of the gauge fields to play the role of the Higgs fields. It is possible to produce electroweak symmetry breaking by imposing certain boundary conditions on the extra dimensional fields, increasing the unitarity breakdown scale up to the energy scale of the extra dimension. Through the AdS/QCD correspondence this model can be related to technicolor models and to "UnHiggs" models in which the Higgs field is of unparticle nature.
- Models of composite W and Z vector bosons.
- Top quark condensate.
- Unitary Weyl gauge. By adding a suitable gravitational term to the standard model action in curved spacetime, the theory develops a local conformal (Weyl) invariance. The conformal gauge is fixed by choosing a reference mass scale based on the gravitational coupling constant. This approach generates the masses for the vector bosons and matter fields similar to the Higgs mechanism without traditional spontaneous symmetry breaking.
- Asymptotically safe weak interactions based on some nonlinear sigma models.
- Preon and models inspired by preons such as Ribbon model of Standard Model particles by Sundance Bilson-Thompson, based in braid theory and compatible with loop quantum gravity and similar theories. The Helon model proposes a topological interpretation of electric and colour charge, representing electric charge through the twists carried by individual ribbons and colour charge through different arrangements of twisted ribbons within a braid. The model also proposes correspondences between braided ribbon structures and the properties of quarks, leptons and gauage bosons. although it does not yet provide a complete, experimentally validated explanation of the Standard Model or the origin of particle masses.
- Symmetry breaking driven by non-equilibrium dynamics of quantum fields above the electroweak scale.
- Unparticle physics and the unhiggs. These are models that posit that the Higgs sector and Higgs boson are scaling invariant, also known as unparticle physics.
- In theory of superfluid vacuum masses of elementary particles can arise as a result of interaction with the physical vacuum, similarly to the gap generation mechanism in superconductors.
- UV-completion by classicalization, in which the unitarization of the WW scattering happens by creation of classical configurations.

== See also ==
- Composite Higgs models
