= Chiral symmetry breaking =

Phenomenon in particle physics

In particle physics, chiral symmetry breaking generally refers to the dynamical spontaneous breaking of a chiral symmetry associated with massless fermions. This is usually associated with a gauge theory such as quantum chromodynamics, the quantum field theory of the strong interaction, and it also occurs through the Brout-Englert-Higgs mechanism in the electroweak interactions of the Standard Model. This phenomenon is analogous to magnetization and superconductivity in condensed matter physics, where, for example, chiral symmetry breaking is the mechanism by which disordered 3D magnetic systems have a finite transition temperature. The basic idea was introduced to particle physics by Yoichiro Nambu, in particular, in the Nambu–Jona-Lasinio model, which is a solvable theory of composite bosons that exhibits dynamical spontaneous chiral symmetry when a 4-fermion coupling constant becomes sufficiently large. Nambu was awarded the 2008 Nobel prize in physics "for the discovery of the mechanism of spontaneous broken symmetry in subatomic physics".

== Overview ==
=== Quantum chromodynamics ===
Massless fermions in 4 dimensions are described by either left or right-handed spinors that each have 2 complex components. These have spin either aligned (right-handed chirality), or counter-aligned (left-handed chirality), with their momenta. In this case the chirality is a conserved quantum number of the given fermion, and the left and right handed spinors can be independently phase transformed. More generally they can form multiplets under some symmetry group $G_L\times G_R {}$.

A Dirac mass term explicitly breaks the chiral symmetry. In quantum electrodynamics (QED) the electron mass unites left and right handed spinors forming a 4 component Dirac spinor. In the absence of mass and quantum loops, QED would have a $U(1)_L\times U(1)_R$ chiral symmetry, but the Dirac mass of the electron breaks this to a single $U(1)$ symmetry that allows a common phase rotation of left and right together, which is the gauge symmetry of electrodynamics. (At the quantum loop level, the chiral symmetry is broken, even for massless electrons, by the chiral anomaly, but the $U(1)$ gauge symmetry is preserved, which is essential for consistency of QED.)

In QCD, the gauge theory of strong interactions, the lowest mass quarks are nearly massless and an approximate chiral symmetry is present. In this case the left- and right-handed quarks are interchangeable in bound states of mesons and baryons, so an exact chiral symmetry of the quarks would imply "parity doubling", and every state should appear in a pair of equal mass particles, called "parity partners". In the notation, (spin)^{parity}, a $0^{+}$ meson would therefore have the same mass as a parity partner $0^{-}$ meson.

Experimentally, however, it is observed that the masses of the $0^-$ pseudoscalar mesons (such as the pion) are much lighter than any of the other particles in the spectrum. The low masses of the pseudoscalar mesons, as compared to the heavier states, is also quite striking. The next heavier states are the vector mesons, $1^-$, such as rho meson, and the $0^+$ scalars mesons and $1^+$ vector mesons are heavier still, appearing as short-lived resonances far (in mass) from their parity partners.

This is a primary consequence of the phenomenon of spontaneous symmetry breaking of chiral symmetry in the strong interactions. In QCD, the fundamental fermion sector consists of three "flavors" of light mass quarks, in increasing mass order: up u, down d, and strange s (as well as three flavors of heavy quarks, charm c, bottom b, and top t ). If we assume the light quarks are ideally massless (and ignore electromagnetic and weak interactions), then the theory has an exact global $SU(3)_\mathsf{L} \times SU(3)_\mathsf{R}$ chiral flavor symmetry. Under spontaneous symmetry breaking, the chiral symmetry is spontaneously broken to the "diagonal flavor SU(3) subgroup", generating low mass Nambu–Goldstone bosons. These are identified with the pseudoscalar mesons seen in the spectrum, and form an octet representation of the diagonal SU(3) flavor group.

Beyond the idealization of massless quarks, the actual small quark masses (and electroweak forces) explicitly break the chiral symmetry as well. This can be described by a chiral Lagrangian where the masses of the pseudoscalar mesons are determined by the quark masses, and various quantum effects can be computed in chiral perturbation theory. This can be confirmed more rigorously by lattice QCD computations, which show that the pseudoscalar masses vary with the quark masses as dictated by chiral perturbation theory, (effectively as the square-root of the quark masses).

The three heavy quarks: the charm quark, bottom quark, and top quark, have masses much larger than the scale of the strong interactions, thus they do not display the features of spontaneous chiral symmetry breaking. However bound states consisting of a heavy quark and a light quark (or two heavies and one light) still display a universal behavior, where the $(0^-,1^-)$ ground states are split from the $(0^+,1^+)$ parity partners by a universal mass gap of about $~ \Delta M \approx 348 \text{ MeV,}~$ (confirmed experimentally by the $\; \mathrm{D}^*_\mathrm{s0}(2317) \;$) due to the light quark chiral symmetry breaking (see below).

=== Light quarks and mass generation ===
If the three light quark masses of QCD are set to zero, we then have a Lagrangian with a symmetry group (Note: See Current algebra.) :$\mathrm{SU}(3)_\mathsf{L} \times \mathrm{SU}(3)_\mathsf{R} \times \mathrm{U}(1)_\mathsf{V} \times \mathrm{U}(1)_\mathsf{A} ~.$ Note that these $\mathrm{SU}(3)$ symmetries, called "flavor-chiral" symmetries, should not be confused with the quark "color" symmetry, $\mathrm{SU}(3)_c$ that defines QCD as a Yang-Mills gauge theory and leads to the gluonic force that binds quarks into baryons and mesons. In this article we will not focus on the binding dynamics of QCD where quarks are confined within the baryon and meson particles that are observed in the laboratory (see Quantum chromodynamics).

A static vacuum condensate can form, composed of bilinear operators involving the quantum fields of the quarks in the QCD vacuum, known as a fermion condensate. This takes the form :$\langle \bar{q}^a_\mathsf{R} \, q^b_\mathsf{L} \rangle = v \, \delta^{ab}$ driven by quantum loop effects of quarks and gluons, with $v$ ≈ −(250 MeV)³ . (Note: Chiral symmetry breaking in QCD is furthermore intimately associated with quantum effects, arising at the Feynman diagram loop level, generating the conformal anomaly and quark confinement.) The condensate is not invariant under independent $SU(3)_\mathsf{L}$ or $SU(3)_\mathsf{R}$ rotations, but is invariant under common $SU(3)$ rotations. The pion decay constant, f_{π} ≈ 93 MeV , may be viewed as the measure of the strength of the chiral symmetry breaking.

The quark condensate is induced by non-perturbative strong interactions and spontaneously breaks the $~\mathrm{SU}(3)_\mathsf{L} \times \mathrm{SU}(3)_\mathsf{R}~$ down to the diagonal vector subgroup $~\mathrm{SU}(3)_\mathsf{V}$; (this contains as a subgroup $~\mathrm{SU}(2)$ the original symmetry of nuclear physics called isospin, which acts upon the up and down quarks). The unbroken subgroup of $~\mathrm{SU}(3)$ constitutes the original pre-quark idea of Gell-Mann and Ne'eman known as the "Eightfold Way" which was the original successful classification scheme of the elementary particles including strangeness. The $\mathrm{U}(1)_\mathsf{A}$ symmetry is anomalous, broken by gluon effects known as instantons and the corresponding meson is much heavier than the other light mesons.

Chiral symmetry breaking is apparent in the mass generation of nucleons, since no degenerate parity partners of the nucleon appear. Chiral symmetry breaking and the quantum conformal anomaly account for approximately 99% of the mass of a proton or neutron, and these effects thus account for most of the mass of all visible matter (the proton and neutron, which form the nuclei of atoms, are baryons, called nucleons). For example, the proton, of mass m_{p} ≈ 938 MeV , contains two up quarks, each with explicit mass m_{u} ≈ 2.3 MeV , and one down quark with explicit mass m_{d} ≈ 4.8 MeV. Naively, the light quark explicit masses only contribute a total of about 9.4 MeV (= 1%) to the proton's mass.

For the light quarks the chiral symmetry breaking condensate can be viewed as inducing the so-called constituent quark masses. Hence, the light up quark, with explicit mass m_{u} ≈ 2.3 MeV , and down quark with explicit mass m_{d} ≈ 4.8 MeV , now acquire constituent quark masses of about m_{u,d} ≈ 300 MeV. QCD then leads to the baryon bound states, which each contain combinations of three quarks (such as the proton (uud) and neutron (udd)). The baryons then acquire masses given, approximately, by the sums of their constituent quark masses.

=== Nambu-Goldstone bosons ===
One of the most spectacular aspects of spontaneous symmetry breaking, in general, is the phenomenon of the Nambu–Goldstone bosons. In QCD these appear as approximately massless particles. corresponding to the eight broken generators of the original $\mathrm{SU}(3)_\mathsf{L} \times \mathrm{SU}(3)_\mathsf{R} ~.$ They include eight mesons: The pions, kaons and the eta meson.

These states have small masses due to the explicit masses of the underlying quarks and as such are referred to as "pseudo-Nambu-Goldstone bosons" or "pNGB's".

pNGB's are a general phenomenon and arise in any quantum field theory with both spontaneous and explicit symmetry breaking, simultaneously. These two types of symmetry breaking typically occur separately, and at different energy scales, and are not predicated on each other. The properties of these pNGB's can be calculated from chiral Lagrangians, using chiral perturbation theory, which expands around the exactly symmetric zero-quark mass theory. In particular, the computed mass must be small. (Note: The resulting generic formula for the mass of pseudogoldstone bosons in the presence of an explicit breaking perturbation is often called Dashen's formula, here $~ m^2_\mathrm{\pi}\ f^2_\mathrm{\pi}\ = -\langle 0| \left[\ Q_5, \left[ Q_5, H \right]\ \right] |0\rangle ~.$)

Technically, the spontaneously broken chiral symmetry generators comprise the coset space $~ \bigl( \mathrm{SU}(3)_\mathsf{L} \times \mathrm{SU}(3)_\mathsf{R} \bigr)\ /\ \mathrm{SU}(3)_\mathsf{V} ~.$ This space is not a group, and consists of the eight axial generators, corresponding to the eight light pseudoscalar mesons, the nondiagonal part of $~ \mathrm{SU}(3)_\mathsf{L} \times \mathrm{SU}(3)_\mathsf{R} ~.$

=== Heavy-light mesons ===
Mesons containing a heavy quark, such as charm (D meson) or beauty, and a light anti-quark (either up, down or strange), can be viewed as systems in which the light quark is "tethered" by the gluonic force to the fixed heavy quark, like a ball tethered to a pole. These systems give us a view of the chiral symmetry breaking in its simplest form, that of a single light-quark state.

In 1994 William A. Bardeen and Christopher T. Hill studied the properties of these systems implementing both the heavy quark symmetry and the chiral symmetries of light quarks in a Nambu–Jona-Lasinio model approximation. They showed that chiral symmetry breaking causes the s-wave ground states $(0^-,1^-)$ (spin$^{\textrm{parity}}$) to be split from p-wave parity partner excited states $(0^+,1^+)$ by a universal "mass gap", $\Delta M$. The Nambu–Jona-Lasinio model gave an approximate estimate of the mass gap of $~ \Delta M \approx 338 \text{ MeV,}~$ which would be zero if the chiral symmetry breaking was turned off. The excited states of non-strange, heavy-light mesons are usually short-lived resonances due to the principal strong decay mode $\mathrm{ D}(0^+,1^+) \rightarrow \mathrm{ \pi } + \mathrm{ D}(0^-,1^-) ~,$ and are therefore hard to observe. Though the results were approximate, they implied the charm-strange excited mesons $~ \mathrm{D_s}(0^+,1^+) ~$ could be abnormally narrow (long-lived) since the principal decay mode, $~ \mathrm{D_s}(0^+,1^+) \rightarrow \mathrm{K} + \mathrm{D_{u,d}}(0^-,1^-) ~,$ would be blocked, owing to the mass of the kaon (K).

In 2003 the $\; \mathrm{D}^*_\mathrm{s0}(2317) \;$ was discovered by the BaBar collaboration, and was seen to be surprisingly narrow, with a mass gap above the $\; \mathrm{D_s} \;$ of $\; \Delta M \approx 348 \text{ MeV ,}$ within a few percent of the model prediction (also the more recently confirmed heavy quark spin-symmetry partner, $\mathrm{D}_\mathrm{s1}^*(2460)$). Bardeen, Eichten and Hill predicted, using the chiral Lagrangian, numerous observable decay modes which have been confirmed by experiments. Similar phenomena should be seen in the $B_s$ mesons and $ccs, bcs, bbs,$ heavy-heavy-strange baryons.

== See also ==
- Conformal anomaly
- Little Higgs
- Top Quark Condensate
