= Giovanni Jona-Lasinio =

Italian theoretical physicist

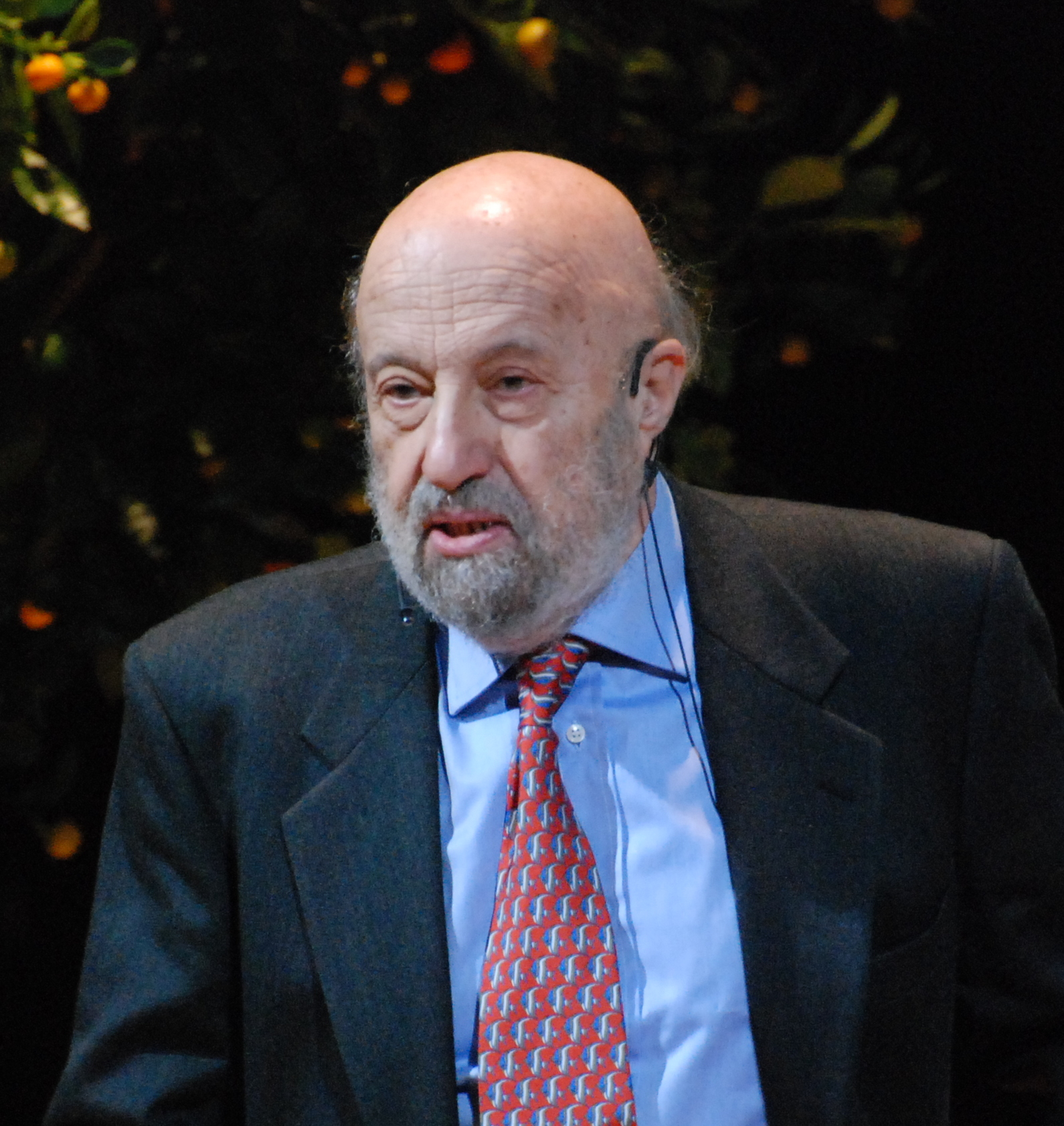
- Education: Sapienza University of Rome
- Known for: Nambu–Jona-Lasinio model
- Awards: Heineman Prize (2012); Boltzmann Medal (2013)
- Scientific career
- Fields: Particle Physics; Statistical mechanics
- Workplaces: Sapienza University of Rome; University of Padua
- Doctoral students: Sergio Doplicher

Giovanni Jona-Lasinio (born 1932), sometimes called Gianni Jona, is an Italian theoretical physicist, best known for his works on quantum field theory and statistical mechanics. He pioneered research concerning spontaneous symmetry breaking, and the Nambu–Jona-Lasinio model is named after him. When Yoichiro Nambu received the Nobel Prize, Jona-Lasinio gave the Nobel Lecture in his place, as a recognition from Nambu for their joint work. At present, he holds a faculty position in the Physics Department of Sapienza University of Rome, and is a full member of the Accademia dei Lincei.

== Life ==
Giovanni Jona-Lasinio was born in Florence, Jewish on his father's side. From 1970 to 1974 he taught electrodynamics at University of Padua. Since 1974 he has been full professor at Sapienza University of Rome, where he teaches mathematical methods of physics. He spent several years abroad, doing his research also at University of Chicago (1959–60), CERN (1964–65), MIT (1965–66), Institut des Hautes Études Scientifiques (1980–81), Université Pierre et Marie Curie (1983–84). In 2004, the Journal of Statistical Physics, a scientific magazine about statistical mechanics, dedicated a special issue in honour of Giovanni Jona-Lasinio.

== Nobel Prize controversy ==
Half of the 2008 Nobel Prize in Physics went to Yoichiro Nambu for the discovery of the mechanism of spontaneous broken symmetry in subatomic physics. The fundamental step in this field is the Nambu–Jona-Lasinio model (NJL model), developed together with Jona-Lasinio, who was left out of the prize. In recognition of his colleague's work, Nambu asked Jona-Lasinio to hold the Nobel Lecture at Stockholm University in his place.

The other half of the 2008 prize for physics was awarded to Makoto Kobayashi and Toshihide Maskawa for their 1972 work on quark mixing. The resulting quark mixing matrix is known as CKM matrix, after Nicola Cabibbo, Kobayashi, and Maskawa. Like Jona-Lasinio, Cabibbo arguably would have deserved a share of the award.

As the Nobel Prize is awarded each year to at most three people for no more than two different research works, in 2008 the committee chose to skip one member each from both the CKM and the NJL workgroups (incidentally, both of them Italian).

== Awards ==
- 2006: Feltrinelli Prize of the Accademia dei Lincei.
- 2012: Dannie Heineman Prize for Mathematical Physics of the American Physical Society.
- 2013: Boltzmann Medal for his contributions to statistical physics, notably phase transitions and the breaking of a continuous symmetry.

== See also ==
- A biography in Italian
- The April 2004 issue (Volume 115, Numbers 1-2) of Journal of Statistical Physics in honor of Giovanni Jona-Lasinio
- A picture of Giovanni Jona-Lasinio
- Effective action
- Kenneth Geddes Wilson
- Nambu-Jona-Lasinio model
