= Nambu–Jona-Lasinio model =

Effective field theory of nucleons

In quantum field theory, the Nambu–Jona-Lasinio model is a complicated effective theory of nucleons and mesons constructed from interacting Dirac fermions with chiral symmetry, paralleling the construction of Cooper pairs from electrons in the BCS theory of superconductivity. The "complicatedness" of the theory has become more natural as it is now seen as a low-energy approximation of the still more basic theory of quantum chromodynamics, which does not work perturbatively at low energies. It is named after Yoichiro Nambu and Giovanni Jona-Lasinio

The model is much inspired by the different field of solid state theory, particularly from the BCS breakthrough of 1957. The model was introduced in a joint article of Yoichiro Nambu (who also contributed essentially to the theory of superconductivity, i.e., by the "Nambu formalism") and Giovanni Jona-Lasinio, published in 1961. A subsequent paper included chiral symmetry breaking, isospin and strangeness. Around that time, the same model was independently considered by Soviet physicists Valentin Vaks and Anatoly Larkin.

== Overview ==
The model is quite technical, although based essentially on symmetry principles. It is an example of the importance of four-fermion interactions and is defined in a spacetime with an even number of dimensions. It is still important and is used primarily as an effective although not rigorous low energy substitute for quantum chromodynamics.

The dynamical creation of a condensate from fermion interactions inspired many theories of the breaking of electroweak symmetry, such as technicolor and the top-quark condensate.

Starting with the one-flavor case first, the Lagrangian density is

$$\mathcal{L} = \ i\ \bar{\psi}\ \partial\!\!\!/\ \psi + \frac{\ \lambda\ }{ 4 } \left[\ \left( \bar{\psi}\ \psi \right) \left( \bar{\psi} \psi \right) - \left( \bar{\psi}\ \gamma^5\ \psi \right) \left( \bar{\psi}\ \gamma^5\ \psi \right)\ \right]$$

or, equivalently, decomposed into left and right chiral parts,

$$\ \mathcal{L}\ = \ i\ \bar{\psi}_\mathsf{L}\ \partial\!\!\!/\ \psi_\mathsf{L}\ +\ i\ \bar{\psi}_\mathsf{R}\ \partial\!\!\!/\ \psi_\mathsf{R}\ +\ \lambda\ \left( \bar{\psi}_\mathsf{L}\ \psi_\mathsf{R}\right) \left(\bar{\psi}_\mathsf{R}\ \psi_\mathsf{L} \right) ~.$$

The terms proportional to $\ \lambda\$ are an attractive four-fermion interaction, which parallels the BCS theory phonon exchange interaction. The global symmetry of the model is U(1)_{Q} × U(1)_{χ} where Q is the ordinary charge of the Dirac fermion and χ is the chiral charge. The parameter $\ \lambda\$ is equivalent to a reciprocal squared mass, $\ \lambda = \tfrac{ 1 }{\ M^2}\ ,$ which represents short-distance physics or the strong interaction scale, producing an attractive four-fermion interaction.

There is no bare fermion mass term because of the chiral symmetry. However, there will be a chiral condensate (but no confinement) leading to an effective mass term and a spontaneous symmetry breaking of the chiral symmetry, but not the charge symmetry.

With N flavors and the flavor indices, represented by the Latin letters a and b, the Lagrangian density becomes

$$\mathcal{L}\ =\ i\ \bar{\psi}_a\partial\!\!\!/\ \psi^a + \frac{ \lambda }{\ 4\ N\ }\ \left[\ \left( \bar{\psi}_a\ \psi^b \right) \left( \bar{\psi}_b\ \psi^a \right) - \left( \bar{\psi}_a\ \gamma^5\ \psi^b \right) \left( \bar{\psi}_b\ \gamma^5\ \psi^a \right)\ \right]\$$

hence

$$\mathcal{L}\ =\ i\ \bar{\psi}_{\mathsf{L}\ a}\ \partial\!\!\!/\ \psi_\mathsf{L}^a\ +\ i\ \bar{\psi}_{\mathsf{R}\ a}\ \partial\!\!\!/\ \psi_\mathsf{R}^a + \frac{ \lambda }{\ N\ }\ \left( \bar{\psi}_{\mathsf{L}\ a}\ \psi_\mathsf{R}^b \right) \left(\bar{\psi}_{\mathsf{R}\ b}\ \psi_\mathsf{L}^a \right) ~.$$

Chiral symmetry forbids a bare mass term, but there may be chiral condensates. The global symmetry here is SU(N)_{L} × SU(N)_{R} × U(1)_{Q} × U(1)_{χ} where SU(N)_{L} × SU(N)_{R} acting upon the left-handed flavors and right-handed flavors respectively is the chiral symmetry (in other words, there is no natural correspondence between the left-handed and the right-handed flavors), U(1)_{Q} is the Dirac charge, which is sometimes called the baryon number and U(1)_{χ} is the axial charge. If a chiral condensate forms, then the chiral symmetry is spontaneously broken into a diagonal subgroup SU(N) since the condensate leads to a pairing of the left-handed and the right-handed flavors. The axial charge is also spontaneously broken.

The broken symmetries lead to (nearly) massless pseudoscalar bosons, e.g. pions. See Goldstone boson.

As mentioned, this model is sometimes used as a phenomenological model of quantum chromodynamics in the chiral limit. However, while it is able to model chiral symmetry breaking and chiral condensates, it does not model confinement. Also, the axial symmetry is broken spontaneously in this model, leading to a massless Goldstone boson unlike QCD, where it is broken anomalously.

Since the Nambu–Jona-Lasinio model is nonrenormalizable in four spacetime dimensions, this theory can only be an effective field theory which needs to be UV completed.

== See also ==
- Gross–Neveu model
