= Quiver diagram =

Diagrams describing the matter content

In theoretical physics, a quiver diagram is a graph representing the matter content of a gauge theory that describes D-branes on orbifolds. Quiver diagrams may also be used to described $\mathcal{N} = 2$ supersymmetric gauge theories in four dimensions.

Each node of the graph corresponds to a factor U(N) of the gauge group, and each link represents a field in the bifundamental representation

$$(M,\bar{N})$$.

The relevance of quiver diagrams for string theory was pointed out and studied by Michael Douglas and Greg Moore.

While string theorists use the words quiver diagram, many of their colleagues in particle physics call these diagrams mooses.

== Definition ==
For convenience, consider the supersymmetric $\mathcal {N} =1$ gauge theory in four-dimensional spacetime.

The quiver gauge theory is given by the following data:

- Finite quiver $Q$
- Each vertex $v\in \operatorname {V} (Q)$ corresponds to a compact Lie group $G_{v}$. This can be the unitary group $U(N)$, the special unitary group $SU(N)$, special orthogonal group $SO(N)$ or symplectic group $USp(N)$.
- The gauge group is the product $\textstyle \prod _{v\in \operatorname {V} (Q)}G_{v}$.
- Each edge of Q $e\colon u\to v$ corresponds to the defining representation ${\bar {N}}_{u}\otimes N_{v}$. There is a corresponding superfield $\Phi _{e}$.

This representation is called a bifundamental representation. For example, if $u$ and $v$ corresponds to $S U ( 2 )$ and $S U ( 3 )$ then the edge corresponds to a six-dimensional representation ${\bar {\mathbf {2} }}_{\operatorname {SU} (2)}\otimes {\mathbf {3} }_{\operatorname {SU} (3)}$

In this case, the quiver gauge theory is a four-dimensional $\mathcal {N} =1$ supersymmetric gauge theory. The quiver gauge theory in higher dimensions can be defined similarly.

The quiver is particularly convenient for representing conformal gauge theory. The structure of the quiver makes it easy to check whether the theory preserves conformal symmetry.

== See also ==
- quiver (mathematics).
