= Flavor-changing neutral current =

Hypothetical particle interactions that would signal physics beyond the Standard Model

Above: Highly suppressed tau decay via flavor-changing neutral current at one-loop order in the Standard Model. Below: Beyond the Standard Model tau decay via flavor-changing neutral current mediated by a new S boson.

An example of a hypothetical (i.e., not yet observed) flavor-changing neutral current process in the Minimal Supersymmetric Standard Model. A strange quark emits a bino, turning into a sdown-type squark, which then emits a Z boson and reabsorbs the bino, turning into a down quark. If the MSSM squark masses are flavor-violating, such a process can occur.

In particle physics, flavor-changing neutral currents or flavour-changing neutral currents (FCNCs) are a class of hypothetical interactions between elementary particles. These interactions would change a particle's flavor (i.e., its type, such as a strange quark changing into a down quark) without changing its electric charge.

In the Standard Model of particle physics, the dominant "tree-level" interactions cannot produce FCNCs. This is described by the GIM mechanism. However, FCNCs can occur through more complex, higher-order processes (so-called "loop diagrams"), but these are extremely rare. Because FCNCs are so heavily suppressed in the Standard Model, physicists consider them a "zero-background" phenomenon. Any clear observation of an FCNC would be a strong indicator of physics beyond the Standard Model.

Experiments at particle colliders, such as the Large Hadron Collider, and dedicated searches, like the MEG experiment, actively look for evidence of FCNCs. So far, the results have been largely consistent with the predictions of the Standard Model. The lack of observed FCNCs places important constraints on the development of new theories and models in physics.

== Details ==
Flavor-changing neutral currents are interactions predicted by some theories, and their potential existence is studied through the Lagrangian terms that would describe them. If they occur in nature, these processes may induce phenomena that have not yet been observed in experiment. While FCNCs may occur in the Standard Model beyond the tree level, they are highly suppressed by the GIM mechanism. Several collaborations have searched for FCNC. The Tevatron CDF experiment observed evidence of FCNC in the decay of the strange B-meson to phi mesons in 2005.

FCNCs are generically predicted by theories that attempt to go beyond the Standard Model, such as the models of supersymmetry or technicolor. Their suppression is necessary for an agreement with observations, making FCNCs important constraints on model-building.

== Example ==
Consider a toy model in which an undiscovered boson S may couple both to the electron as well as the tau (τ^{−}) via the term

$$S\bar\psi_e\psi_\tau$$

Since the electron and the tau have equal charges, the electric charge of S clearly must vanish to respect the conservation of electric charge. A Feynman diagram with S as the intermediate particle is able to convert a tau into an electron (plus some neutral decay products of the S).

The MEG experiment at the Paul Scherrer Institute near Zürich will search for a similar process, in which an antimuon decays to a photon and an antielectron (a positron). In the Standard Model, such a process proceeds only by emission and re-absorption of a charged W^{+}, which changes the μ^{+} into a neutrino on emission and then a positron on re-absorption, and finally emits a photon that carries away any difference in energy, spin, and momentum.

In most cases of interest, the boson involved is not a new boson S but the conventional Z^{0} boson itself. This can occur if the coupling to weak neutral currents is (slightly) non-universal. The dominant universal coupling to the Z boson does not change flavor, but sub-dominant non-universal contributions can.

FCNCs involving the Z boson for the down-type quarks at zero momentum transfer are usually parameterized by the effective action term

$$\frac{g}{2\cos \theta_\text{W}}\overline{d}_{L\alpha}U_{\alpha\beta}\gamma^\mu d_{L\beta}Z_\mu$$

This particular example of FCNC is often studied the most because we have some fairly strong constraints coming from the decay of B^{0} mesons in Belle and BaBar. The off-diagonal entries of U parameterizes the FCNCs and current constraints restrict them to be less than one part in a thousand for |U_{bs}|. The contribution coming from the one-loop Standard Model corrections are actually dominant, but the experiments are precise enough to measure slight deviations from the Standard Model prediction.

Experiments tend to focus on flavor-changing neutral currents as opposed to charged currents, because the weak neutral current (Z^{0} boson) does not change flavor in the Standard Model proper at the tree level whereas the weak charged currents (W^{±} bosons) do. New physics in charged current events would be swamped by more numerous W^{±} boson interactions; new physics in the neutral current would not be masked by a large effect due to ordinary Standard Model physics.

== See also ==
- Neutral particle oscillation
- Penguin diagram
- Two-Higgs-doublet model
