= Bifundamental representation =

In mathematics and theoretical physics, a bifundamental representation is a representation obtained as a tensor product of two fundamental or antifundamental representations.

For example, the MN-dimensional representation (M,N) of the group

$$SU(M) \times SU(N)$$

is a bifundamental representation. These representations occur in quiver diagrams.
