= Topcolor =

Topcolor is a model in theoretical physics, of dynamical electroweak symmetry breaking in which the top quark and anti-top quark form a composite Higgs boson by a new force arising from massive "top gluons". The solution to composite Higgs models was actually anticipated in 1981, and found to be the Infrared fixed point for the top quark mass.

== Analogy with known physics ==
The composite Higgs boson made from a bound pair of top-anti-top quarks is analogous to the phenomenon of superconductivity, where Cooper pairs are formed by the exchange of phonons. The pairing dynamics and its solution was treated in the Bardeen-Hill-Lindner model.

The original topcolor naturally involved an extension of the Standard Model color gauge group to a product group SU(3)×SU(3)×SU(3)×... One of the gauge groups contains the top and bottom quarks, and has a sufficiently large coupling constant to cause the condensate to form. The topcolor model anticipates the idea of dimensional deconstruction and extra space dimensions, as well as the large mass of the top quark.

== Top Condensation Redux ==
The original minimal top condensation model predicted the Brout-Englert-Higgs boson mass to be about twice the observed value of 125 GeV. However, this was based upon the Nambu-Jona-Lasinio model, which lacks an internal wave-function, $\phi(r)$. This becomes a large effect when the coupling constant is near its critical value and must be included. Hill recently reformulated the NJL model, using "bilocal fields" and topcolor, which includes $\phi(r)$, and obtained excellent agreement with the experimental values of the top quark mass and BEH boson mass (equivalently, the standard model quartic coupling $\lambda$). The theory requires little fine-tuning and predicts new gauge bosons ("colorons" ) with a mass scale of 5 - 7 TeV, possibly accessible to the CERN LHC.

== See also ==
- Fermion condensate
- Technicolor (physics)
- Hierarchy problem
- Top quark condensate
