= Top quark condensate =

Hypothetical composite Higgs model

In particle physics, the top quark condensate theory (or top condensation) is an alternative to the Standard Model fundamental Higgs field, where the Higgs boson is a composite field, composed of the top quark and its antiquark. The top quark-antiquark pairs are bound together by a new force called topcolor, analogous to the binding of Cooper pairs in a BCS superconductor, or mesons in the strong interactions. The top quark is very heavy, with a measured mass of approximately 174 GeV (comparable to the electroweak scale), and so its Yukawa coupling is of order unity, suggesting the possibility of strong coupling dynamics at high energy scales. This model attempts to explain how the electroweak scale may match the top quark mass.

== Original Models ==
The idea was described by Yoichiro Nambu and subsequently developed by Miransky, Tanabashi, and Yamawaki (1989) and William A. Bardeen, Christopher T. Hill, and Manfred Lindner (1990), who connected the theory to the renormalization group, and improved its predictions.

The renormalization group reveals that top quark condensation is fundamentally based upon the infrared fixed point for the top quark Higgs-Yukawa coupling, proposed by Pendleton and Ross (1981) and Hill. The "infrared" fixed point originally predicted that the top quark would be heavy, contrary to the prevailing view of the early 1980s. Indeed, the top quark was discovered in 1995 at the large mass of 174 GeV. The infrared-fixed point implies that it is strongly coupled to the Higgs boson at very high energies, corresponding to the Landau pole of the Higgs-Yukawa coupling. At this high scale a bound-state Higgs forms, and in the "infrared", the coupling relaxes to its measured value of order unity by the renormalization group. The Standard Model renormalization group fixed point prediction is about 220 GeV, and the observed top mass is roughly 20% lower than this prediction. The simplest top condensation models are now ruled out by the LHC discovery of the Higgs boson at a mass scale of 125 GeV. However, extended versions of the theory, introducing more particles, can be consistent with the observed top quark and Higgs boson masses.

The composite Higgs boson arises "naturally" in Topcolor models, that are extensions of the standard model using a hypothetical force analogous to quantum chromodynamics. To be "natural", that is, without excessive fine-tuning (i.e. to stabilize the Higgs mass from large radiative corrections), the hypothesis requires new physics at a relatively low energy scale. Placing new physics at 10 TeV, for instance, the model predicts the top quark to be significantly heavier than observed (at about 600 GeV vs. 171 GeV). Top Seesaw models, also based upon Topcolor, circumvent this difficulty.

== Top condensation, redux ==
The original minimal top condensation model predicted the Brout–Englert–Higgs boson mass to be about twice the observed value of 125 GeV. However, this was based upon the Nambu-Jona-Lasinio model, which lacks an internal wave-function, $\ \phi(r) ~.$ This becomes a large effect when the coupling constant is near its critical value and must be included. Hill recently reformulated the NJL model, using "bilocal fields" (these provide an effective description of the Bethe-Salpeter equation wave-function) and topcolor, which includes $\ \phi(r)\ ,$ and obtained excellent agreement with the experimental values of the top quark mass and Higgs boson mass (equivalently, the standard model quartic coupling $\ \lambda\$). The theory requires little fine-tuning and predicts new gauge bosons ("colorons") with a mass scale of 5–7 TeV, possibly accessible to the CERN LHC.

== See also ==
- Bose–Einstein condensation
- Fermion condensate
- Hierarchy problem
- Technicolor (physics)
