= Manfred Lindner =

German physicist

- Born: 22 February 1957 (age 69); Ellenfeld, Germany
- Awards: AAAS Fellow (2020); Honorary Doctor at KTH, Stockholm (2016); Heisenberg Fellowship of DFG (1990)
- Scientific career
- Fields: Physics
- Institutions: Fermilab; CERN; Heidelberg University; Technical University of Munich; Max-Planck-Institut für Kernphysik

Manfred Lindner (born 22 February 1957) is a German physicist and director at the Max Planck Institute for Nuclear Physics in Heidelberg, Germany. He conducts basic research in particle and astro-particle physics.

== Life and Scientific Work ==
Manfred Lindner studied physics from 1978 bis 1984 at LMU Munich, Germany, where he received his PhD in 1987. Subsequently, he was from 1987 to 1989 postdoc at the Fermi National Accelerator Laboratory (Fermilab) in Chicago and from 1989 to 1991 Fellow at CERN in Geneva, Switzerland. After that, Manfred Lindner spent 1991–1993 with a Heisenberg-Fellowship at Heidelberg University in Heidelberg, Germany.

Manfred Lindner got his Habilitation in 1992. In 1993, he became a professor for theoretical physics at the Technical University of Munich where he was teaching and conducting research from 1993 until 2006. Starting 2006 he became director at the Max Planck Institute for Nuclear Physics in Heidelberg, Germany. Since 2007 he is also a professor at the faculty for physics and astronomy of Heidelberg University, where he continues to teach. From 2009 until 2011 he was managing director of the Max Planck Institute for Nuclear Physics. He is spokesperson of the International Max Planck Research School for Precision Tests of Fundamental Symmetries (IMPRS-PTFS) and he is furthermore in various international research networks. Manfred Lindner works as referee for various national and international agencies and he is referee or member of the editorial board for various scientific journals. He is furthermore a member of numerous advisory boards of international conferences, and he was Chair of the most important international conference on neutrino physics in 2018 in Heidelberg (NEUTRINO 2018).

== Main research areas ==
The research of Manfred Lindner is in the field of particle and astro-particle physics. The research spectrum ranges from formal theoretical questions to experimental projects. The theoretical studies concern the standard model of particle physics and its extensions. On the experimental side Manfred Lindner and his division make leading contributions to international research projects in the field of neutrino physics and dark matter search. The main experimental projects is currently XENON aiming at the direct detection of Dark Matter. Lindner is co-spokesperson of the international XENON Collaboration which achieved with its XENON1T detector world-leading results for the direct detection of Dark Matter. The next detector generation, XENONnT, became operational in 2021 and it will push the sensitivity further. The CONUS-Experiment aims in the area of neutrino physics at detecting coherent neutrino scattering at low energies. Another project is the STEREO experiment which aims at detecting or refuting sterile neutrinos at the research reactor at ILL in Grenoble. The GERDA experiment and its upgrade to LEGEND200 aim at detecting neutrino-less double beta decay. Various R&D activities aim at future experiments like DARWIN and future neutrino experiments.

== Distinctions and awards ==
In 1990 he was awarded a Heisenberg Stipendium of the Deutschen Forschungsgemeinschaft (DFG) which he used from 1991 to teach and conduct research at the Universität Heidelberg. In 2016 Manfred Lindner was awarded an honorary doctorate of the KTH Royal Institute of Technology (Kungliga Tekniska Högsksolan, KTH) in Stockholm for important contributions to neutrino physics. The conferment took place on 18 November 2016 at an academic ceremony in the Stockholm Concert Hall, followed by a banquet and ballroom dancing in the City hall of Stockholm. KTH was founded in 1827 and is Sweden's largest institution of higher education in technology and it awards honorary doctorates to individuals who have done outstanding work while at the same time providing KTH with positive attention. The American Association for the Advancement of Science (AAAS) selected Lindner in 2020 as AAAS Fellow in recognition for distinguished contributions to both theoretical and experimental particle physics.

== Publications (selection) ==
- Huber, Patrick; Lindner, Manfred; Schwetz, Thomas; Winter, Walter (2009-11-10). "First hint for CP violation in neutrino oscillations from upcoming superbeam and reactor experiments". Journal of High Energy Physics. 2009 (11): 044. arXiv:0907.1896. Bibcode:2009JHEP...11..044H. doi:10.1088/1126-6708/2009/11/044. ISSN 1029-8479. S2CID 2658041.
- Bandyopadhyay, A; Choubey, S; Gandhi, R; Goswami, S; Roberts, B L; et al. (2009-09-29). "Physics at a future Neutrino Factory and super-beam facility". Reports on Progress in Physics. 72 (10) 106201. arXiv:0710.4947. Bibcode:2009RPPh...72j6201B. doi:10.1088/0034-4885/72/10/106201. ISSN 0034-4885. S2CID 122788857.
- Bezrukov, F.; Hettmansperger, H.; Lindner, M. (2010-04-22). "keV sterile neutrino dark matter in gauge extensions of the standard model". Physical Review D. 81 (8) 085032. arXiv:0912.4415. Bibcode:2010PhRvD..81h5032B. doi:10.1103/physrevd.81.085032. ISSN 1550-7998. S2CID 118450077.
- Aprile, E.; Arisaka, K.; Arneodo, F.; Askin, A.; Baudis, L.; et al. (XENON100) (2011-09-19). "Dark Matter Results from 100 Live Days of XENON100 Data". Physical Review Letters. 107 (13) 131302. arXiv:1104.2549. Bibcode:2011PhRvL.107m1302A. doi:10.1103/physrevlett.107.131302. ISSN 0031-9007. PMID 22026838. S2CID 9685630.
- Abe, Y.; Aberle, C.; Akiri, T.; dos Anjos, J. C.; Ardellier, F.; et al. (Double Chooz) (2012-03-28). "Indication of Reactor ν¯_{e} Disappearance in the Double Chooz Experiment". Physical Review Letters. 108 (13) 131801. American Physical Society (APS). arXiv:1112.6353. Bibcode:2012PhRvL.108m1801A. doi:10.1103/physrevlett.108.131801. ISSN 0031-9007. PMID 22540693. S2CID 121722959.
- Holthausen, Martin; Lim, Kher Sham; Lindner, Manfred (2012). "Planck scale boundary conditions and the Higgs mass". Journal of High Energy Physics. 2012 (2): 037. arXiv:1112.2415. Bibcode:2012JHEP...02..037H. doi:10.1007/jhep02(2012)037. ISSN 1029-8479. S2CID 119222877.

A complete listing of scientific publications by Manfred Lindner can be found on INSPIRE-HEP at this link.
