= Infrared fixed point =

Low energy fixed point

In physics, an infrared fixed point is a set of coupling constants, or other parameters, that evolve from arbitrary initial values at very high energies (short distance) to fixed, stable values, usually predictable, at low energies (large distance). This usually involves the use of the renormalization group, which specifically details the way parameters in a physical system (a quantum field theory) depend on the energy scale being probed.

Conversely, if the length-scale decreases and the physical parameters approach fixed values, then we have ultraviolet fixed points. The fixed points are generally independent of the initial values of the parameters over a large range of the initial values. This is known as universality.

== Statistical physics ==
In the statistical physics of second order phase transitions, the physical system approaches an infrared fixed point that is independent of the initial short distance dynamics that defines the material. This determines the properties of the phase transition at the critical temperature, or critical point. Observables, such as critical exponents usually depend only upon dimension of space, and are independent of the atomic or molecular constituents.

== Top Quark ==
In the Standard Model, quarks and leptons have "Yukawa couplings" to the Higgs boson which determine the masses of the particles. Most of the quarks' and leptons' Yukawa couplings are small compared to the top quark's Yukawa coupling. Yukawa couplings are not constants and their properties change depending on the energy scale at which they are measured, this is known as running of the constants. The dynamics of Yukawa couplings are determined by the renormalization group equation:

$$\ \mu\ \frac{\partial}{\partial\mu}\ y_q \approx \frac{ y_q  }{\ 16\pi^2\ }\left(\frac{\ 9\ }{2}y_q^2 - 8 g_3^2\right)\ ,$$

where $\ g_3\$ is the color gauge coupling (which is a function of $\ \mu\$ and associated with asymptotic freedom ) and $\ y_q\$ is the Yukawa coupling for the quark $\ q \in \{ \mathrm{u, b, t} \}~.$ This equation describes how the Yukawa coupling changes with energy scale $\ \mu ~.$

A more complete version of the same formula is more appropriate for the top quark:

$$\ \mu\ \frac{\ \partial}{\partial\mu}\ y_\mathrm{t} \approx \frac{\ y_\text{t}\ }{16\ \pi^2}\left(\frac{\ 9\ }{2}y_\mathrm{t}^2 - 8 g_3^2- \frac{\ 9\ }{4}g_2^2 - \frac{\ 17\ }{20} g_1^2 \right)\ ,$$

where g_{2} is the weak isospin gauge coupling and g_{1} is the weak hypercharge gauge coupling. For small or near constant values of g_{1} and g_{2} the qualitative behavior is the same.

The Yukawa couplings of the up, down, charm, strange and bottom quarks, are small at the extremely high energy scale of grand unification, $\ \mu \approx 10^{15} \mathrm{ GeV } ~.$ Therefore, the $\ y^2_q\$ term can be neglected in the above equation for all but the top quark. Solving, we then find that $\ y_q\$ is increased slightly at the low energy scales at which the quark masses are generated by the Higgs, $\ \mu \approx 125\ \mathrm{ GeV } ~.$

On the other hand, solutions to this equation for large initial values typical for the top quark $\ y_\mathrm{t}\$ cause the expression on the right side to quickly approach zero as we descend in energy scale, which stops$\ y_\mathrm{t}\$ from changing and locks it to the QCD coupling $\ g_3 ~.$ This is known as a (infrared) quasi-fixed point of the renormalization group equation for the Yukawa coupling. (Note: The name "infrared" is metaphorical, since the effect is seen as energy decreases, by analogy with descent to light with lower energy than visible light. Effects which appear with rising energy are metaphorically called "ultraviolet".) No matter what the initial starting value of the coupling is, if it is sufficiently large at high energies to begin with, it will reach this quasi-fixed point value, and the corresponding quark mass is predicted to be about $\ m \approx 220\ \mathrm{ GeV } ~.$

The renormalization group equation for large values of the top Yukawa coupling was first considered in 1981 by Pendleton & Ross, and the "infrared quasi-fixed point" was proposed by Hill. The prevailing view at the time was that the top quark mass would lie in a range of 15 to 26 GeV. The quasi-infrared fixed point emerged in top quark condensation theories of electroweak symmetry breaking in which the Higgs boson is composite at extremely short distance scales, composed of a pair of top and anti-top quarks.

While the value of the quasi-fixed point is determined in the Standard Model of about $\ m \approx 220\ \mathrm{ GeV } ~,$ if there is more than one Higgs doublet, the value will be reduced by an increase in the 9 /2 factor in the equation, and any Higgs mixing angle effects. Since the observed top quark mass of 174 GeV is slightly lower than the standard model prediction by about 20%, this suggests there may be more Higgs doublets beyond the single standard model Higgs boson. If there are many additional Higgs doublets in nature the predicted value of the quasi-fixed point comes into agreement with experiment. Even if there are two Higgs doublets, the fixed point for the top mass is reduced, 170~200 GeV. Some theorists believed this was supporting evidence for the Supersymmetric Standard Model, however no other signs of supersymmetry have emerged at the Large Hadron Collider.

== Banks–Zaks fixed point ==
Another example of an infrared fixed point is the Banks–Zaks fixed point in which the coupling constant of a Yang–Mills theory evolves to a fixed value. The beta-function vanishes, and the theory possesses a symmetry known as conformal symmetry.

== See also ==
- Top quark
- Cutoff (physics)
- Gaussian fixed point
