= List of things named after Julian Schwinger =

Things named after physicist Julian Schwinger include the following:

- Birman–Schwinger principle
- Schwinger effect (Schwinger pair production)
- Schwinger function
- Schwinger limit
- Schwinger model
- Schwinger parametrization
- Schwinger representation
- Schwinger reversed-phase coupler
- Schwinger variational principle
- Schwinger's quantum action principle
- Schwinger–Dyson equation
- Schwinger–Tomonaga equation
- Fock–Schwinger gauge
- Jordan–Schwinger map
- Rarita–Schwinger equation
- Lippmann–Schwinger equation
- Kubo–Martin–Schwinger state
- Schwinger boson representation
