= Edward Yao =

York-Peng Edward Yao is a physicist from Hong Kong. During his junior year of college, he received a nonresident scholarship from the University of California, Berkeley to complete his baccalaureate studies in engineering, and graduated in 1960. Yao completed his master's degree and doctorate at Harvard University, advised by Julian Schwinger, who helped Yao obtain a postdoctoral research position with J. Robert Oppenheimer at the Institute for Advanced Study. In 1966, Yao began teaching at the University of Michigan as an assistant professor. He became associate professor in 1972 and full professor in 1978. In 1995, Yao was elected a fellow of the American Physical Society "[f]or his important contributions to the quantization of gauge theories with spontaneous symmetry breaking and many interesting calculations in the standard model." Yao was granted emeritus status in 2008.
