= Schwinger–Dyson equation =

Equations for correlation functions in QFT

The Schwinger–Dyson equations (SDEs) or Dyson–Schwinger equations, named after Julian Schwinger and Freeman Dyson, are general relations between correlation functions in quantum field theories (QFTs). They are also referred to as the Euler–Lagrange equations of quantum field theories, since they are the equations of motion corresponding to the Green's function. They form a set of infinitely many functional differential equations, all coupled to each other, sometimes referred to as the infinite tower of SDEs.

In his paper "The S-Matrix in Quantum electrodynamics", Dyson derived relations between different S-matrix elements, or more specific "one-particle Green's functions", in quantum electrodynamics, by summing up infinitely many Feynman diagrams, thus working in a perturbative approach. Starting from his variational principle, Schwinger derived a set of equations for Green's functions non-perturbatively, which generalize Dyson's equations to the Schwinger–Dyson equations for the Green functions of quantum field theories. Today they provide a non-perturbative approach to quantum field theories and applications can be found in many fields of theoretical physics, such as solid-state physics and elementary particle physics.

Schwinger also derived an equation for the two-particle irreducible Green functions, which is nowadays referred to as the inhomogeneous Bethe–Salpeter equation.

== Derivation ==
Given a polynomially bounded functional $F$ over the field configurations, then, for any state vector (which is a solution of the QFT), $|\psi\rangle$, we have

$$\left\langle\psi\left|\mathcal{T}\left\{\frac{\delta}{\delta\varphi}F[\varphi]\right\}\right|\psi\right\rangle = -i\left\langle\psi\left|\mathcal{T}\left\{F[\varphi]\frac{\delta}{\delta\varphi}S[\varphi]\right\}\right|\psi\right\rangle$$

where $\frac{\delta}{\delta \varphi}$ is the functional derivative with respect to $\varphi$, $S$ is the action functional and $\mathcal{T}$ is the time ordering operation.

Equivalently, in the density state formulation, for any (valid) density state $\rho$, we have

$$\rho\left(\mathcal{T}\left\{\frac{\delta}{\delta\varphi}F[\varphi]\right\}\right) = -i\rho\left(\mathcal{T}\left\{ F[\varphi] \frac{\delta}{\delta\varphi}S[\varphi]\right\}\right).$$

This infinite set of equations can be used to solve for the correlation functions nonperturbatively.

To make the connection to diagrammatic techniques (like Feynman diagrams) clearer, it is often convenient to split the action $S$ as

$$S[\varphi] = \tfrac{1}{2}\varphi^{i}D^{-1}_{ij}\varphi^{j} + S_{\text{int}}[\varphi],$$

where the first term is the quadratic part and $D^{-1}$ is an invertible symmetric (antisymmetric for fermions) covariant tensor of rank two in the deWitt notation whose inverse, $D$ is called the bare propagator and $S_{\text{int}}[\varphi]$ is the "interaction action". Then, we can rewrite the SD equations as

$$\left\langle\psi\left\vert\mathcal{T}\left\{F \varphi^j\right\}\right\vert\psi\right\rangle=\left\langle\psi\left\vert\mathcal{T}\left\{iF_{,i}D^{ij}-FS_{\text{int},i}D^{ij}\right\}\right\vert\psi\right\rangle.$$

If $F$ is a functional of $\varphi$, then for an operator $K$, $F[K]$ is defined to be the operator which substitutes $K$ for $\varphi$. For example, if

$$F[\varphi]=\frac{\partial^{k_1}}{\partial x_1^{k_1}}\varphi(x_1)\cdots \frac{\partial^{k_n}}{\partial x_n^{k_n}}\varphi(x_n)$$

and $G$ is a functional of $J$, then

$$F\left[-i\frac{\delta}{\delta J}\right]G[J]=(-i)^n \frac{\partial^{k_1}}{\partial x_1^{k_1}}\frac{\delta}{\delta J(x_1)} \cdots \frac{\partial^{k_n}}{\partial x_n^{k_n}}\frac{\delta}{\delta J(x_n)} G[J].$$

If we have an "analytic" (a function that is locally given by a convergent power series) functional $Z$ (called the generating functional) of $J$ (called the source field) satisfying

$$\frac{\delta^n Z}{\delta J(x_1) \cdots \delta J(x_n)}[0]=i^n Z[0] \langle\varphi(x_1)\cdots \varphi(x_n)\rangle,$$

then, from the properties of the functional integrals

$${\left \langle \frac{\delta \mathcal{S}}{\delta \varphi(x)}\left[\varphi \right] + J(x)\right\rangle}_J=0,$$

the Schwinger–Dyson equation for the generating functional is

$$\frac{\delta S}{\delta \varphi(x)}\left[-i \frac{\delta}{\delta J} \right] Z[J] + J(x)Z[J]=0.$$

If we expand this equation as a Taylor series about $J = 0$, we get the entire set of Schwinger–Dyson equations.

== An example: φ^{4} ==
To give an example, suppose

$$S[\varphi]=\int d^dx \left (\tfrac{1}{2} \partial^\mu \varphi(x) \partial_\mu \varphi(x) -\tfrac{1}{2}m^2\varphi(x)^2 -\frac{\lambda}{4!}\varphi(x)^4\right )$$

for a real field $\varphi$.

Then,

$$\frac{\delta S}{\delta \varphi(x)}=-\partial_\mu \partial^\mu \varphi(x) -m^2 \varphi(x) - \frac{\lambda}{3!}\varphi^3(x).$$

The Schwinger–Dyson equation for this particular example is:

$$i\partial_\mu \partial^\mu \frac{\delta}{\delta J(x)}Z[J]+im^2\frac{\delta}{\delta J(x)}Z[J]-\frac{i\lambda}{3!}\frac{\delta^3}{\delta J(x)^3} Z[J] + J(x)Z[J] = 0$$

Note that since

$$\frac{\delta^3}{\delta J(x)^3}$$

is not well-defined because

$$\frac{\delta^3}{\delta J(x_1)\delta J(x_2) \delta J(x_3)} Z[J]$$

is a distribution in

$x_1$, $x_2$ and $x_3$,

this equation needs to be regularized.

In this example, the bare propagator D is the Green's function for $-\partial^\mu \partial_\mu-m^2$ and so, the Schwinger–Dyson set of equations goes as

$$\begin{align}
& \langle\psi\mid\mathcal{T}\{ \varphi(x_0) \varphi(x_1)\} \mid \psi\rangle \\[4pt]
= {} & iD(x_0,x_1) +\frac{\lambda}{3!}\int d^dx_2 \, D(x_0,x_2) \langle \psi \mid \mathcal{T} \{\varphi(x_1)\varphi(x_2)\varphi(x_2)\varphi(x_2)\} \mid \psi\rangle
\end{align}$$

and

$$\begin{align}
& \langle\psi\mid\mathcal{T}\{\varphi(x_0) \varphi(x_1) \varphi(x_2) \varphi(x_3)\} \mid \psi\rangle \\[6pt]
= {} & iD(x_0,x_1)\langle\psi\mid\mathcal{T}\{\varphi(x_2)\varphi(x_3)\}\mid\psi\rangle + iD(x_0,x_2)\langle\psi\mid\mathcal{T}\{\varphi(x_1)\varphi(x_3)\}\mid\psi\rangle \\[4pt]
& {} + iD(x_0,x_3)\langle\psi\mid\mathcal{T}\{\varphi(x_1)\varphi(x_2)\}\mid\psi\rangle \\[4pt]
& {} + \frac{\lambda}{3!}\int d^dx_4 \, D(x_0,x_4)\langle\psi\mid\mathcal{T}\{\varphi(x_1)\varphi(x_2)\varphi(x_3)\varphi(x_4)\varphi(x_4)\varphi(x_4)\}\mid\psi\rangle
\end{align}$$

etc.

(Unless there is spontaneous symmetry breaking, the odd correlation functions vanish.)

== See also ==
- Functional renormalization group
- Dyson equation
- Path integral formulation
- Source field
