= Background field method =

Technique in quantum field theory

In theoretical physics, background field method is a useful procedure to calculate the effective action of a quantum field theory by expanding a quantum field around a classical "background" value B:

$$\phi(x) = B(x) + \eta (x)$$.

After this is done, the Green's functions are evaluated as a function of the background. This approach has the advantage that the gauge invariance is manifestly preserved if the approach is applied to gauge theory.

== Method ==
We typically want to calculate expressions like

$$Z[J] = \int \mathcal D \phi \exp\left(\mathrm{i} \int \mathrm{d}^d x (\mathcal L [\phi(x)] + J(x) \phi(x))\right)$$

where J(x) is a source, $\mathcal L(x)$ is the Lagrangian density of the system, d is the number of dimensions and $\phi(x)$ is a field.

In the background field method, one starts by splitting this field into a classical background field B(x) and a field η(x) containing additional quantum fluctuations:

$$\phi(x) = B(x) + \eta(x) \,.$$

Typically, B(x) will be a solution of the classical equations of motion

$$\left.\frac{\delta S}{\delta \phi}\right|_{\phi = B} = 0$$

where S is the action, i.e. the space integral of the Lagrangian density. Switching on a source J(x) will change the equations into

$$\left.\frac{\delta S}{\delta \phi}\right|_{\phi = B} + J= 0$$.

Then the action is expanded around the background B(x):

$$\begin{align}
\int d^d x (\mathcal L [\phi(x)] + J(x) \phi(x)) & = \int d^d x (\mathcal L [B(x)] + J(x) B(x)) \\
& + \int d^d x \left(\frac{\delta\mathcal L}{\delta \phi(x)} [B] + J(x)\right) \eta(x) \\
& + \frac12 \int d^d x d^d y \frac{\delta^2\mathcal L}{\delta \phi(x) \delta\phi(y)} [B] \eta(x) \eta(y) + \cdots
\end{align}$$

The second term in this expansion is zero by the equations of motion. The first term does not depend on any fluctuating fields, so that it can be brought out of the path integral. The result is

$$Z[J] = e^{i \int d^d x (\mathcal L [B(x)] + J(x) B(x))} \int \mathcal D \eta e^{\frac i2 \int d^d x d^d y \frac{\delta^2\mathcal L}{\delta \phi(x) \delta\phi(y)} [B] \eta(x) \eta(y) + \cdots}.$$

The path integral which now remains is (neglecting the corrections in the dots) of Gaussian form and can be integrated exactly:

$$Z[J] = C e^{i \int d^d x (\mathcal L [B(x)] + J(x) B(x))} \left(\det \frac{\delta^2\mathcal L}{\delta \phi(x) \delta\phi(y)} [B]\right)^{-1/2} + \cdots$$

where "det" signifies a functional determinant and C is a constant. The power of minus one half will naturally be plus one for Grassmann fields.

The above derivation gives the Gaussian approximation to the functional integral. Corrections to this can be computed, producing a diagrammatic expansion.

== See also ==
- BF theory
- Effective action
- Source field
