= Christof Wetterich =

German physicist

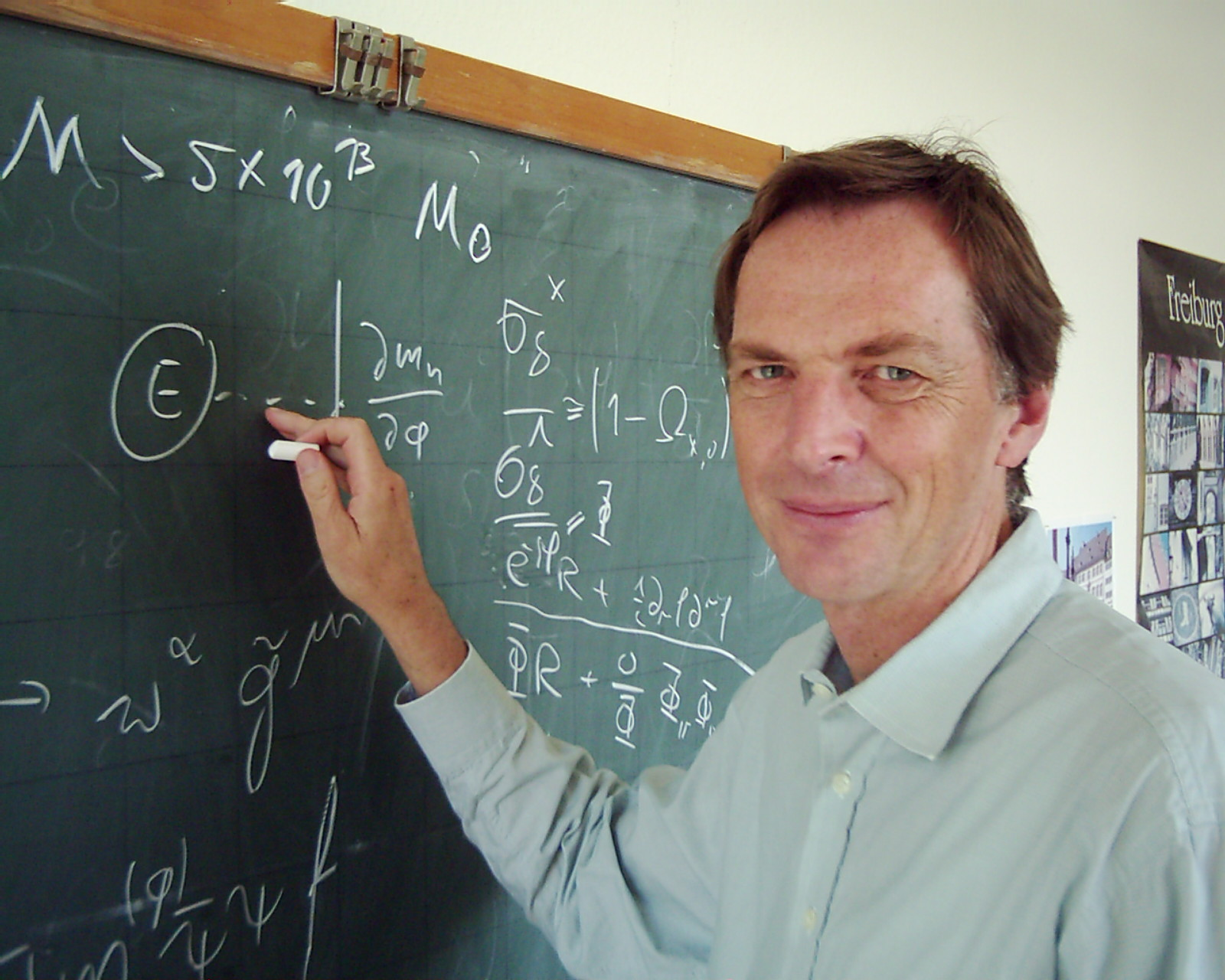
- Born: 12 April 1952 (age 74); Freiburg, West Germany
- Education: Freiburg University (Diplom); Freiburg University (PhD)
- Known for: type II seesaw mechanism; Functional renormalization group; quintessence; Wetterich equation; Asymptotic safety in quantum gravity
- Awards: Max-Planck Research Prize (2005)
- Scientific career
- Fields: Theoretical physics
- Workplaces: Freiburg University; University of Bern; CERN; DESY; UCSB; Heidelberg University
- Thesis: Ein vereinheitlichtes Modell der schwachen und elektromagnetischen Wechselwirkung (1979)
- Doctoral advisor: Josef Honerkamp

Christof Wetterich (born 12 April 1952) is a German theoretical physicist. He is a professor of theoretical physics at the Heidelberg University. He is known for his work on the Seesaw mechanism in grand unification theory (GUT), quintessence, the Wetterich equation for the functional renormalization group (FRG) and asymptotic safety in quantum gravity.

== Early life and education ==
Wetterich was born in Freiburg on 12 April 1952. He studied physics at the University of Paris VII, the University of Cologne and the Freiburg University, where he received his Ph.D. in 1979 and was habilitated in 1983.

== Research and career ==
His primary research interests are cosmology and quantum field theory. Two of his notable theoretical developments are quintessence and the functional renormalization group. These methods have found applications in many areas of physics. Functional renormalization provides a suitable framework for studying quantum gravity (asymptotic safety), Yang–Mills theories and it was also useful in non-relativistic quantum systems such as BCS to BEC crossover where it bridges the two theories in a unified theoretical language.

In 1977–1986, he performed fundamental calculations for the theoretical understanding of tiny neutrino masses in GUT. This work was incorporated into the Type II seesaw mechanism in subsequent studies.

In 1987–2001, he completed two of his two best known theoretical proposals: the dynamical dark energy or quintessence model, developed in 1987., which could explain the observed accelerated expansion of the universe. The functional renormalization group relates macroscopic physical structures to microscopic physical laws through to a renormalization group of effective average actions. Its basic formula is the Wetterich equation (or FRG Flow Equation). He developed this in 1993 and a review of FRG was published in 2001.

In 2013, based on dilatation symmetry, he proposed the cosmon field model, in which the Planck mass increases but there is no big bang singularity.

He has worked at CERN in Geneva and DESY in Hamburg. Since 1992 he has held a professorship in theoretical physics at the Ruprecht-Karls-Universität Heidelberg.

== Honours and awards ==
In 2005, Wetterich received the Max-Planck Research Prize. Since 2006 he is member of the Heidelberg Academy of Sciences.
