= Lawrence Paul Horwitz =

American-Israeli mathematician

Larry Horwitz
- לורנס פול הורביץ
- Born: Lawrence Paul Horwitz; October 14, 1930 (age 95); New York City, New York, United States
- Education: Columbia University; Harvard University
- Known for: Particle physics Statistical mechanics Mathematical physics Classical chaos and Quantum chaos Relativistic quantum mechanics Quantum field theory General relativity Group theory and Functional analysis
- Awards: Samuel Finley Breese Morse Medal
- Scientific career
- Fields: Physics Mathematics
- Workplaces: University of Geneva; University of Denver; Tel Aviv University; Bar Ilan University; Ariel University Center of Samaria
- Doctoral advisor: Julian Schwinger

Lawrence Paul Horwitz (Hebrew: לורנס פול הורביץ; born October 14, 1930) is an American/Israeli physicist and mathematician who has made contributions in particle physics, statistical mechanics, mathematical physics, theory of unstable systems, classical chaos and quantum chaos, relativistic quantum mechanics, quantum field theory, general relativity, representations of quantum theory on hypercomplex Hilbert modules, group theory and functional analysis and stochastic theories of irreversible quantum evolution.

After obtaining his Ph.D. at Harvard University under Julian Schwinger, he worked at the IBM Research Laboratory in Yorktown, New York until 1964. He then worked at the Department of Theoretical Physics at the University of Geneva, Geneva, Switzerland, until 1966, and became full professor at the Department of Physics, University of Denver, Denver, Colorado.

He has been full professor at the School of Physics, Tel Aviv University since 1972 (professor emeritus since 1998), and teaching externally as well at Bar Ilan University from 1990. He has been participating as well in research at the Ariel University Center of Samaria.

He has been on the editorial and advisory boards and standing committees for several conferences on mathematical and theoretical physics and journals, and on the Panel of Assessors ARC, Australian National Funding DEET.

He has made frequent visits, long and short term, at the Institute for Advanced Study, Princeton, New Jersey, the Department of Theoretical Physics, University of Geneva, CERN (Geneva), University of Connecticut (Storrs, Connecticut), ETH (Honggerberg, Zurich), Institut des Hautes Etudes Scientifiques (Bures-sur-Yvette, France), and the Ilya Prigogine Center for Statistical Mechanics and Complex Systems, University of Texas at Austin, United States.

== Research and achievements ==
He received the Samuel F.B. Morse Medal upon graduation (summa cum laude) from NYU, and was a member of Sigma Pi Sigma and Tau Beta Pi. He received a National Science Foundation Fellowship 52–53 and was a Shell Oil Fellow 56–57 at Harvard University. Three issues of Foundations of Physics were dedicated to him on the occasion of his 65 birthday [Foundations of Physics 26 (1996)1575–1739, 27(1997) 1–134, and 27(1997) 135–332]. He received an Outstanding Referee Award from the American Physical Society in 2008.
