= Julian Schwinger =

American theoretical physicist (1918–1994)

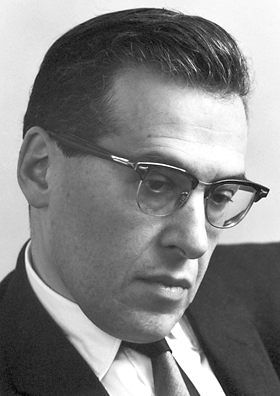
- Schwinger in 1965
- Born: Julian Seymour Schwinger; February 12, 1918; New York City, U.S.
- Died: July 16, 1994 (aged 76); Los Angeles, California, U.S.
- Education: City College of New York; Columbia University (BA, PhD)
- Known for: Quantum electrodynamics; Electroweak interaction; Cavity perturbation theory; Dyon; Spin–statistics theorem; MacMahon Master theorem; Source theory; Mutually unbiased bases; Keldysh formalism; List of things named after Julian Schwinger
- Spouse: Clarice Carrol (m. 1947) (1917-2011)
- Awards: Albert Einstein Award (1951); National Medal of Science (1964); Nobel Prize in Physics (1965)
- Scientific career
- Fields: Quantum field theory
- Workplaces: University of California, Berkeley; Purdue University; Massachusetts Institute of Technology; Harvard University; University of California, Los Angeles; University of Chicago
- Thesis: On the magnetic scattering of neutrons (1939)
- Doctoral advisor: Isidor Isaac Rabi
- Doctoral students: Richard Arnowitt; Roy Glauber; Ben R. Mottelson; Eugen Merzbacher; Sheldon Glashow; Walter Kohn; Bryce DeWitt; Daniel Kleitman; Sam Edwards; Gordon Baym; Lowell S. Brown; Stanley Deser; Lawrence Paul Horwitz; Margaret G. Kivelson; Tung-Mow Yan; Charles M. Sommerfield; Kenneth Alan Johnson; Bernard Lippmann

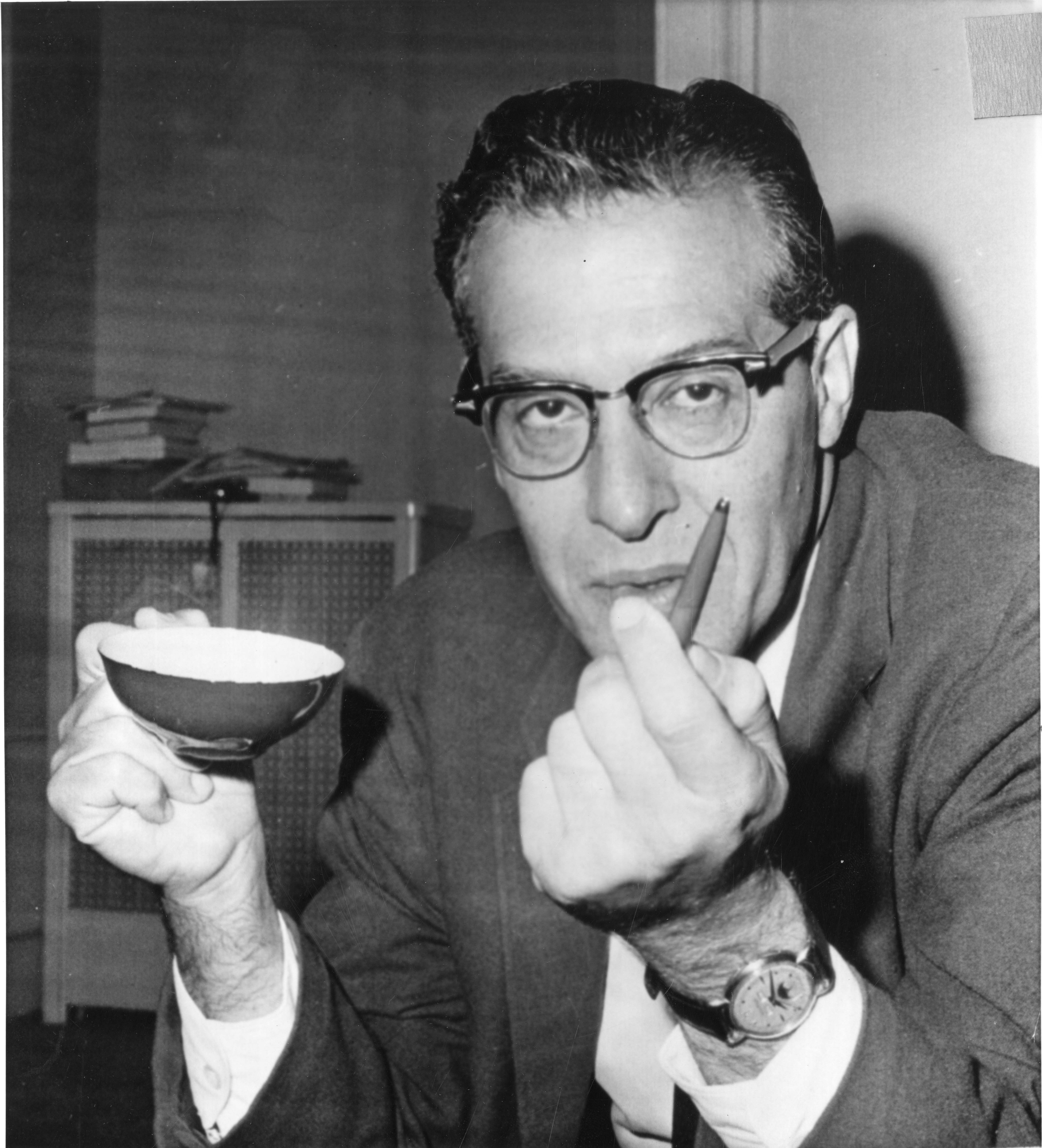
Julian Schwinger, winner of the 1965 Nobel Prize in Physics. Original caption: "His laboratory is his ballpoint pen."

Julian Seymour Schwinger (/ˈʃwɪŋər/; February 12, 1918 – July 16, 1994) was an American theoretical physicist. He shared the 1965 Nobel Prize in Physics with Richard Feynman and Shin'ichirō Tomonaga "for their fundamental work in quantum electrodynamics (QED), with deep-ploughing consequences for the physics of elementary particles". He developed a relativistically invariant perturbation theory, and renormalized QED to one loop order. Schwinger was a physics professor at several universities.

Schwinger is recognized as an important physicist, responsible for much of modern quantum field theory, including a variational approach, and the equations of motion for quantum fields. He developed the first electroweak model, and the first example of confinement in 1+1 dimensions. He is responsible for the theory of multiple neutrinos, Schwinger terms, and the theory of the spin-3/2 field. He shared the inaugural Albert Einstein Award with Kurt Gödel.

== Biography ==
=== Early life and career ===
Julian Seymour Schwinger was born in New York City, to Ashkenazi Jewish parents, Belle (née Rosenfeld) and Benjamin Schwinger, a garment manufacturer, who had emigrated from Poland to the United States. Both his father and his mother's parents were prosperous clothing manufacturers, although the family business declined after the Wall Street Crash of 1929. The family followed the Orthodox Jewish tradition. Julian's older brother Harold Schwinger was born in 1911, seven years before Julian who was born in 1918.

Schwinger was a precocious student. He attended the Townsend Harris High School from 1932 to 1934, a highly regarded high school for gifted students at the time. During high school, Julian had already started reading Physical Review papers by authors such as Paul Dirac in the library of the City College of New York, in whose campus Townsend Harris was then located. He published his first paper when he was seventeen.

In the fall of 1934, Schwinger entered the City College of New York as an undergraduate. CCNY automatically accepted all Townsend Harris graduates at the time, and both institutions offered free tuition. Due to his intense interest in physics and mathematics, Julian performed very well in those subjects despite often skipping classes and learning directly from books. On the other hand, his lack of interest for other topics such as English led to academic conflicts with teachers of those subjects.

After Julian had joined CCNY, his brother Harold, who had previously graduated from CCNY, asked his ex-classmate Lloyd Motz to "get to know [Julian]". Lloyd was a CCNY physics instructor and Ph.D. candidate at Columbia University at the time. Lloyd made the acquaintance, and soon recognized Julian's talent. Noticing Schwinger's academic problems, Lloyd decided to ask Isidor Isaac Rabi who he knew at Columbia for help. Rabi also immediately recognized Schwinger's capabilities on their first meeting, and then made arrangements to award Schwinger with a scholarship to study at Columbia. At first Julian's bad grades in some subjects at CCNY prevented the scholarship award. But Rabi persisted and showed an unpublished paper on quantum electrodynamics written by Schwinger to Hans Bethe, who happened to be passing by New York. Bethe's approval of the paper and his reputation in that domain were then enough to secure the scholarship for Julian, who then transferred to Columbia. His academic situation at Columbia was much better than at CCNY. He was accepted into the Phi Beta Kappa society and received his B.A. in 1936.

During Schwinger's graduate studies, Rabi felt that it would be good for Julian to visit other institutions around the country, and Julian was awarded a travelling fellowship for the year 37/38 which he spent working with Gregory Breit and Eugene Wigner. During this time, Schwinger, who previously had already had the habit of working until late at night, went further and made the day/night switch more complete, working at night and sleeping during the day, a habit he would carry throughout his career. Schwinger later commented that this switch was in part a way to retain greater intellectual independence and avoid being "dominated" by Breit and Wigner by simply reducing the duration of contact with them by working different hours.

Schwinger obtained his PhD overseen by Rabi in 1939 at the age of 21.

During the fall of 1939 Schwinger started working at the University of California, Berkeley under J. Robert Oppenheimer, where he stayed for two years as an NRC fellow.

On June 8, 1947, Schwinger married Clarice Carrol. They had no children.

=== Career ===
After having worked with Oppenheimer, Schwinger's first regular academic appointment was at Purdue University in 1941. While on leave from Purdue, he worked at the MIT Radiation Laboratory instead of at the Los Alamos National Laboratory during World War II. He provided theoretical support for the development of radar. After the war, Schwinger left Purdue for Harvard University, where he taught from 1945 to 1974. In 1966 he became the Eugene Higgins professor of physics at Harvard.

Schwinger developed an affinity for Green's functions from his radar work, and he used these methods to formulate quantum field theory in terms of local Green's functions in a relativistically invariant way. This allowed him to calculate unambiguously the first corrections to the electron magnetic moment in quantum electrodynamics. Earlier non-covariant work had arrived at infinite answers, but the extra symmetry in his methods allowed Schwinger to isolate the correct finite corrections.

Schwinger developed renormalization, formulating quantum electrodynamics unambiguously to one-loop order.

In the same era, he introduced non-perturbative methods into quantum field theory, by calculating the rate at which electron–positron pairs are created by tunneling in an electric field, a process now known as the "Schwinger effect." This effect could not be seen in any finite order in perturbation theory.

Schwinger's foundational work on quantum field theory constructed the modern framework of field correlation functions and their equations of motion. His approach started with a quantum action and allowed bosons and fermions to be treated equally for the first time, using a differential form of Grassmann integration. He gave elegant proofs for the spin-statistics theorem and the CPT theorem, and noted that the field algebra led to anomalous Schwinger terms in various classical identities, because of short distance singularities. These were foundational results in field theory, instrumental for the proper understanding of anomalies.

In other notable early work, Rarita and Schwinger formulated the Rarita–Schwinger equation, using a vector of Dirac spinors as a concrete form of the abstract Pauli and Fierz theory of the spin-3/2 field. In order for the spin-3/2 field to interact consistently, some form of supersymmetry is required, and Schwinger later regretted that he had not followed up on this work far enough to discover supersymmetry.

In 1957, Schwinger predicted that neutrinos come in multiple varieties, one for the electron and one for the muon. Nowadays there are known to be three light neutrinos; the third is the partner of the tau lepton.

In the 1960s, Schwinger formulated and analyzed what is now known as the Schwinger model, quantum electrodynamics in one space and one time dimension, the first example of a confining theory. He was also the first to suggest an electroweak gauge theory, an $SU(2)$ gauge group spontaneously broken to electromagnetic $U(1)$ at long distances. This was extended by his student Sheldon Glashow into the accepted pattern of electroweak unification. He attempted to formulate a theory of quantum electrodynamics with point magnetic monopoles, a program which met with limited success because monopoles are strongly interacting when the quantum of charge is small.

Having supervised 73 doctoral dissertations, Schwinger is known as one of the most prolific graduate advisors in physics. Four of his students won Nobel prizes: Roy Glauber, Benjamin Roy Mottelson, Sheldon Glashow and Walter Kohn (in chemistry).

Schwinger had a mixed relationship with his colleagues, because he always pursued independent research, different from mainstream fashion. In particular, Schwinger developed the source theory, a phenomenological theory for the physics of elementary particles, which is a predecessor of the modern effective field theory. It treats quantum fields as long-distance phenomena and uses auxiliary 'sources' that resemble currents in classical field theories. The source theory is a mathematically consistent field theory with clearly derived phenomenological results. The criticisms by his Harvard colleagues led Schwinger to leave the faculty in 1972 for UCLA. It is a story widely told that Steven Weinberg, who inherited Schwinger's paneled office in Lyman Laboratory, there found a pair of old shoes, with the implied message, "think you can fill these?" Based on Schwinger's source theory, Weinberg set the underpinnings of the effective field theory, that is more appreciated among physicists. In spite of the shoes incident, Weinberg gave the credit to Schwinger for the inspiration.

At UCLA, and for the rest of his career, Schwinger continued to develop the source theory and its various applications. After 1989 Schwinger took a keen interest in the non-mainstream research of cold fusion. He wrote eight theory papers about it. He resigned from the American Physical Society after their refusal to publish his papers. He felt that cold fusion research was being suppressed and academic freedom violated. He wrote, "The pressure for conformity is enormous. I have experienced it in editors' rejection of submitted papers, based on venomous criticism of anonymous referees. The replacement of impartial reviewing by censorship will be the death of science."

In his last publications, Schwinger proposed a theory of sonoluminescence as a long-distance quantum radiative phenomenon associated not with atoms, but with fast-moving surfaces in the collapsing bubble, where there are discontinuities in the dielectric constant. The mechanism of sonoluminescence now supported by experiments focuses on superheated gas inside the bubble as the source of the light.

Schwinger was jointly awarded the Nobel Prize in Physics in 1965 for his work on quantum electrodynamics (QED), along with Richard Feynman and Shin'ichirō Tomonaga. Schwinger's awards and honors were numerous even before his Nobel win. They include the first Albert Einstein Award (1951), the U.S. National Medal of Science (1964), honorary D.Sc. degrees from Purdue University (1961) and Harvard University (1962), and the Nature of Light Award of the U.S. National Academy of Sciences (1949). In 1987, Schwinger received the Golden Plate Award of the American Academy of Achievement.

=== Schwinger and Feynman ===
As a famous physicist, Schwinger was often compared to another legendary physicist of his generation, Richard Feynman. Schwinger was more formally inclined and favored symbolic manipulations in quantum field theory. He worked with local field operators, and found relations between them, and he felt that physicists should understand the algebra of local fields, no matter how paradoxical it was. By contrast, Feynman was more intuitive, believing that the physics could be extracted entirely from the Feynman diagrams, which gave a particle picture. Schwinger commented on Feynman diagrams in the following way,

Like the silicon chips of more recent years, the Feynman diagram was bringing computation to the masses.

Schwinger disliked Feynman diagrams because he felt that they made the student focus on the particles and forget about local fields, which in his view inhibited understanding. He went so far as to ban them altogether from his class, although he understood them perfectly well. The true difference is however deeper, and it was expressed by Schwinger in the following passage,

Eventually, these ideas led to Lagrangian or action formulations of quantum mechanics, appearing in two distinct but related forms, which I distinguish as differential and integral. The latter, spearheaded by Feynman has had all the press coverage, but I continue to believe that the differential viewpoint is more general, more elegant, more useful.

Despite sharing the Nobel Prize, Schwinger and Feynman had a different approach to quantum electrodynamics and to quantum field theory in general. Feynman used a regulator, while Schwinger was able to formally renormalize to one loop without an explicit regulator. Schwinger believed in the formalism of local fields, while Feynman had faith in the particle paths. They followed each other's work closely, and each respected the other. On Feynman's death, Schwinger described him as

An honest man, the outstanding intuitionist of our age, and a prime example of what may lie in store for anyone who dares to follow the beat of a different drum.

=== Death ===
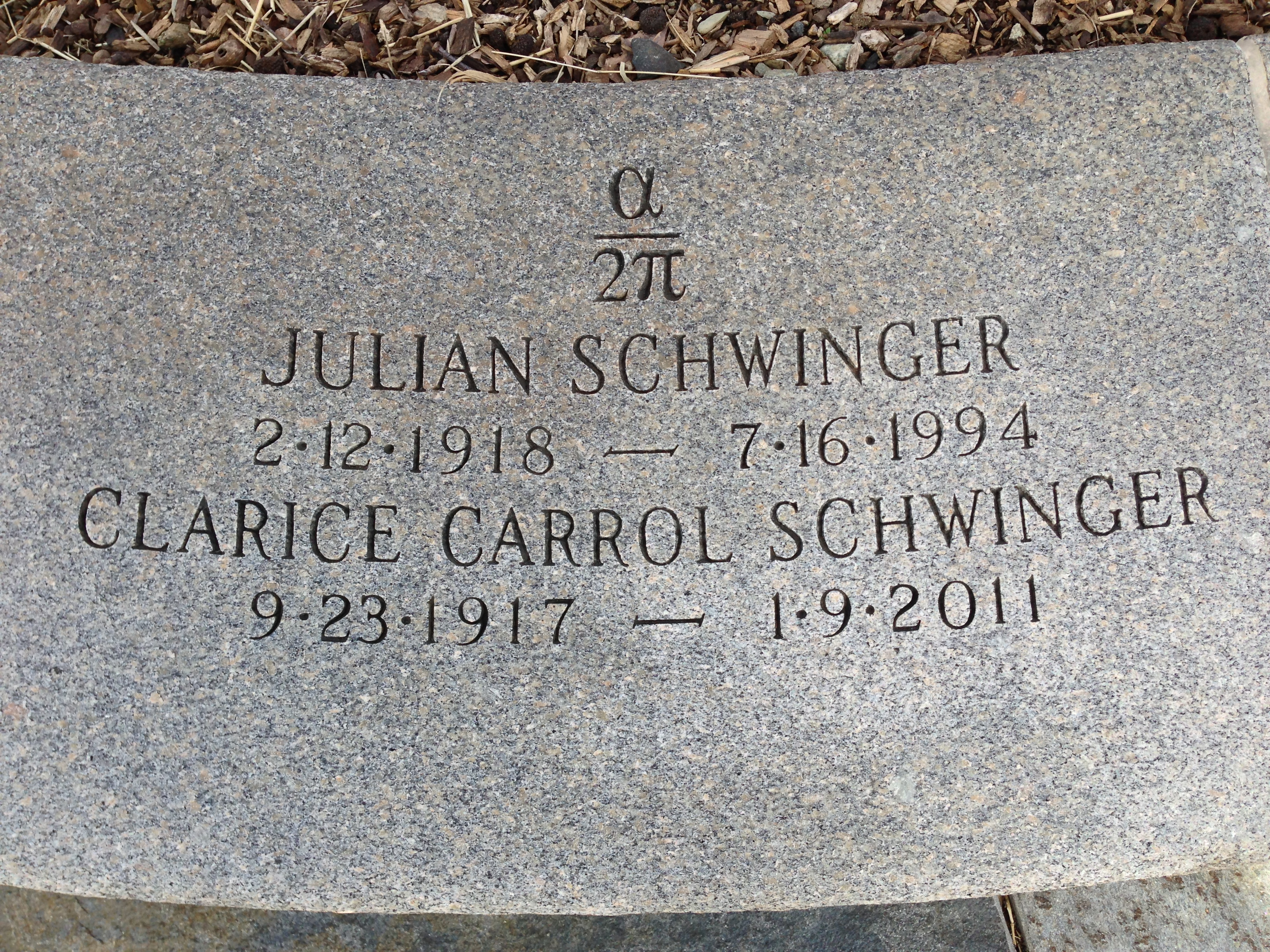
The headstone of Julian Schwinger at Mt. Auburn Cemetery in Cambridge, MA.

Schwinger died of pancreatic cancer. He is buried at Mount Auburn Cemetery; $\frac{\alpha}{2\pi}$, where $\alpha$ is the fine structure constant, is engraved above his name on his tombstone. These symbols refer to his calculation of the correction ("anomalous") to the magnetic moment of the electron.

== Selected publications ==
Books

- Milton KA, A Quantum Legacy: Seminal Papers of Julian Schwinger, World Scientific, 2000.
- Milton KA, Schwinger J, Classical Electrodynamics, 2nd ed, Taylor & Francis, 2024.
- Milton KA, Schwinger J, Electromagnetic Radiation: Variational Methods, Waveguides and Accelerators, Springer, 2006.
- Schwinger J, Einstein's Legacy: The Unity of Space and Time, Dover, 2002.
- Schwinger J, Particles, Sources, and Fields, 3 vols, CRC, 2018.
- Schwinger J, Quantum Kinematics and Dynamics, Westview, 2000.
- Schwinger J, Quantum Mechanics: Symbolism of Atomic Measurements, Springer, 2001.
- Schwinger J, Saxon DS, Discontinuities in Waveguides, Gordon and Breach, 1968.

Articles

- Julian Schwinger (1948). "On Quantum-Electrodynamics and the Magnetic Moment of the Electron". Physical Review. 73 (4): 416–417. Bibcode:1948PhRv...73..416S. doi:10.1103/physrev.73.416. Zbl 0035.13102. Wikidata Q21709238.
- Julian Schwinger (1948). "Quantum Electrodynamics. I. A Covariant Formulation". Physical Review. 74 (10): 1439–1461. Bibcode:1948PhRv...74.1439S. doi:10.1103/physrev.74.1439. Zbl 0032.09404. Wikidata Q27346842.
- Julian Schwinger (1949). "Quantum Electrodynamics. II. Vacuum Polarization and Self-Energy". Physical Review. 75 (4): 651–679. Bibcode:1949PhRv...75..651S. doi:10.1103/physrev.75.651. Zbl 0033.23406. Wikidata Q56021118.
- Julian Schwinger (1949). "Quantum Electrodynamics. III. The Electromagnetic Properties of the Electron—Radiative Corrections to Scattering". Physical Review. 76 (6): 790–817. Bibcode:1949PhRv...76..790S. doi:10.1103/physrev.76.790. Zbl 0035.13201. Wikidata Q56021119.
- Feshbach, H., Schwinger, J. and J. A. Harr. "Effect of Tensor Range in Nuclear Two-Body Problems", Computation Laboratory of Harvard University, United States Department of Energy (through predecessor agency the Atomic Energy Commission) (November 1949).
- Julian Schwinger (1951). "On Gauge Invariance and Vacuum Polarization". Physical Review. 82 (5): 664–679. Bibcode:1951PhRv...82..664S. doi:10.1103/physrev.82.664. Zbl 0043.42201. Wikidata Q21709192.
- Schwinger, J. "On Angular Momentum", Harvard University, Nuclear Development Associates, Inc., United States Department of Energy (through predecessor agency the Atomic Energy Commission) (January 26, 1952).
- Schwinger, J. "The Theory of Quantized Fields. II", Harvard University, United States Department of Energy (through predecessor agency the Atomic Energy Commission) (1951).
- Schwinger, J. "The Theory of Quantizied Fields. Part 3", Harvard University, United States Department of Energy (through predecessor agency the Atomic Energy Commission) (May 1953).

== See also ==
- List of things named after Julian Schwinger
- List of Jewish Nobel laureates
- List of textbooks in electromagnetism
