= Schwinger's quantum action principle =

Approach to quantum theory

Schwinger's quantum action principle is a variational approach to quantum mechanics and quantum field theory. This theory was introduced by Julian Schwinger in a series of articles starting 1950.

== Approach ==
In Schwinger's approach, the action principle is targeted towards quantum mechanics. The action becomes a quantum action, i.e. an operator, $S$. Although it is superficially different from the path integral formulation where the action is a classical function, the modern formulation of the two formalisms are identical.

Suppose we have two states defined by the values of a complete set of commuting operators at two times. Let the early and late states be $| A \rang$ and $| B \rang$, respectively. Suppose that there is a parameter in the Lagrangian which can be varied, usually a source for a field. The main equation of Schwinger's quantum action principle is:

$$\delta \langle B|A\rangle = i \langle B| \delta S |A\rangle,\$$

where the derivative is with respect to small changes ($\delta$) in the parameter, and $S=\int \mathcal{L} \, \mathrm{d}t$ with $\mathcal{L}$ the Lagrange operator.

In the path integral formulation, the transition amplitude is represented by the sum over all histories of $\exp(iS)$, with appropriate boundary conditions representing the states $| A \rang$ and $| B \rang$. The infinitesimal change in the amplitude is clearly given by Schwinger's formula. Conversely, starting from Schwinger's formula, it is easy to show that the fields obey canonical commutation relations and the classical equations of motion, and so have a path integral representation. Schwinger's formulation was most significant because it could treat fermionic anticommuting fields with the same formalism as bose fields, thus implicitly introducing differentiation and integration with respect to anti-commuting coordinates.

== Derivation of field equations and commutation relations ==
The Schwinger quantum action principle provides a unified framework for deriving both the equations of motion and the quantization conditions (commutation relations) for a quantum field theory. Unlike the canonical formalism, which postulates commutation relations, or the path integral formalism, which relies on functional integration, Schwinger's method derives these properties directly from the variation of the action operator $\hat{S}$.

=== The variational principle ===
The principle asserts that the variation of the transformation amplitude between two spacelike surfaces $\sigma_1$ and $\sigma_2$ is determined by the matrix element of the variation of the action operator:

$$\delta \langle \sigma_2 | \sigma_1 \rangle = i \langle \sigma_2 | \delta \hat{S}_{21} | \sigma_1 \rangle.$$

For a field theory involving a generic field $\hat{\phi}$ and Lagrangian density $\hat{\mathcal{L}}(\hat{\phi}, \partial_\mu \hat{\phi})$, the action is the integral over the spacetime volume $\Omega$ bounded by $\sigma_1$ and $\sigma_2$:

$$\hat{S}_{21} = \int_{\sigma_1}^{\sigma_2} d^4x \, \hat{\mathcal{L}}(\hat{\phi}, \partial_\mu \hat{\phi}).$$

The variation $\delta \hat{S}$ arises from infinitesimal changes in the field operator $\hat{\phi} \to \hat{\phi} + \delta \hat{\phi}$. Using the chain rule and integration by parts (generalized Green's identities), the variation separates into a "bulk" volume integral and a "boundary" surface integral:

$$\delta \hat{S}_{21} = \int_{\Omega} d^4x \left[ \frac{\partial \hat{\mathcal{L}}}{\partial \hat{\phi}} - \partial_\mu \left( \frac{\partial \hat{\mathcal{L}}}{\partial (\partial_\mu \hat{\phi})} \right) \right] \delta \hat{\phi}
+ \int_{\partial \Omega} d\sigma_\mu \, \hat{\pi}^\mu \delta \hat{\phi},$$

where $\hat{\pi}^\mu = \frac{\partial \hat{\mathcal{L}}}{\partial (\partial_\mu \hat{\phi})}$ is the conjugate momentum four-vector.

=== Euler–Lagrange equations ===
Schwinger postulated that for the state evolution to be physically meaningful, the transition amplitude must depend only on the boundary conditions at $\sigma_1$ and $\sigma_2$, not on the arbitrary variations in the interior of the spacetime volume. Therefore, the volume integral term in the variation must vanish for arbitrary field variations $\delta \hat{\phi}$ that vanish at the boundaries.

This requirement immediately yields the Euler–Lagrange equations as operator equations of motion:

$$\partial_\mu \left( \frac{\partial \hat{\mathcal{L}}}{\partial (\partial_\mu \hat{\phi})} \right) - \frac{\partial \hat{\mathcal{L}}}{\partial \hat{\phi}} = 0.$$

=== Canonical commutation relations ===
The remaining non-vanishing part of the action variation is the boundary term. If the boundaries are constant-time surfaces $t_1$ and $t_2$, the surface element is $d\sigma_\mu = (d^3x, 0, 0, 0)$, and the boundary term involves the canonical momentum $\hat{\pi} = \hat{\pi}^0$. The variation of the action becomes the difference of generators $\hat{G}$ at the boundaries:

$$\delta \hat{S}_{21} = \hat{G}(t_2) - \hat{G}(t_1), \quad \text{where} \quad \hat{G}(t) = \int d^3x \, \hat{\pi}(\mathbf{x}, t) \delta \hat{\phi}(\mathbf{x}, t).$$

According to the quantum action principle, this generator $\hat{G}$ generates infinitesimal unitary transformations on the fields. For a generic operator $\hat{A}$, an infinitesimal transformation generated by $\hat{G}$ is given by the commutator:

$$\delta \hat{A} = i [\hat{G}, \hat{A}].$$

Considering the variation of the field operator $\hat{\phi}(\mathbf{y}, t)$ itself, we substitute $\hat{A} = \hat{\phi}(\mathbf{y}, t)$:

$$\delta \hat{\phi}(\mathbf{y}, t) = i \left[ \int d^3x \, \hat{\pi}(\mathbf{x}, t) \delta \hat{\phi}(\mathbf{x}, t), \, \hat{\phi}(\mathbf{y}, t) \right].$$

Assuming the variation $\delta \hat{\phi}$ commutes with the field operators (c-number variation), it can be pulled out of the commutator:

$$\delta \hat{\phi}(\mathbf{y}, t) = i \int d^3x \, \delta \hat{\phi}(\mathbf{x}, t) [\hat{\pi}(\mathbf{x}, t), \hat{\phi}(\mathbf{y}, t)].$$

For this equation to hold for an arbitrary variation function $\delta \hat{\phi}(\mathbf{x}, t)$, the kernel of the integral must be a Dirac delta function. This enforces the canonical commutation relation:

$$[\hat{\phi}(\mathbf{y}, t), \hat{\pi}(\mathbf{x}, t)] = i \delta^{(3)}(\mathbf{y} - \mathbf{x}).$$

Thus, the quantization of the field is not an ad hoc assumption but a necessary consequence of the boundary terms in the Schwinger action principle.

== Derivation of the Schwinger–Dyson equations ==
The Schwinger–Dyson equations (SDEs) can be derived directly from the Schwinger quantum action principle without recourse to the functional integral formalism. This approach, pioneered by Julian Schwinger, relies on the operator nature of the fields and the canonical commutation relations implied by the action principle.

=== The action principle and field equations ===
The Schwinger action principle states that the variation of the transition amplitude between two states $\langle \text{out} | \text{in} \rangle$ under a variation of parameters or fields is proportional to the matrix element of the variation of the action operator $\hat{S}$:

$$\delta \langle \text{out} | \text{in} \rangle = i \left\langle \text{out} \left| \delta \hat{S} \right| \text{in} \right\rangle.$$

For a scalar field theory with the action functional

$$S[\phi] = \int d^4x \left( \tfrac{1}{2} \partial_\mu \phi \partial^\mu \phi - V(\phi) \right),$$

the principle implies the Euler–Lagrange equations holding as operator equations of motion (Heisenberg equations):

$$\square \hat{\phi}(x) + V'\left(\hat{\phi}(x)\right) = 0.$$

When an external source $J(x)$ is coupled linearly to the field via a term $\int J(x)\phi(x) d^4x$, the operator equation becomes:

$$\square_x\hat{\phi}(x) + V'\left(\hat{\phi}(x)\right) = J(x).$$

=== Time-ordered products and contact terms ===
The $n$-point Green's function (correlation function) is defined as the vacuum expectation value of the time-ordered product of field operators:

$$G_n(x, x_1, \ldots, x_n) = \left\langle \Omega \left| T \{ \hat{\phi}(x) \hat{\phi}(x_1) \cdots \hat{\phi}(x_n) \} \right| \Omega \right\rangle.$$

To derive the SDEs, one applies the differential operator $\square_x$ to this Green's function. Because the time-ordering operator $T$ involves Heaviside step functions $\theta(t - t')$, the time derivatives inside the d'Alembertian $\square_x = \partial_t^2 - \nabla^2$ act on the step functions, generating Dirac delta functions (contact terms).

Using the definition of time-ordering for two fields:

$$T \left\{ \hat{\phi}(x) \hat{\phi}(y) \right\} = \theta\left(x^0 - y^0\right) \hat{\phi}(x) \hat{\phi}(y) + \theta\left(y^0 - x^0\right) \hat{\phi}(y) \hat{\phi}(x).$$

Taking the first time derivative $\partial_{x^0}$:

$$\partial_{x^0} T \left\{ \hat{\phi}(x) \hat{\phi}(y) \right\} = T \left\{ \dot{\hat{\phi}}(x) \hat{\phi}(y) \right\} + \delta\left(x^0 - y^0\right) \left[\hat{\phi}(x), \hat{\phi}(y)\right].$$

The commutator of fields at equal times vanishes, $\left[\hat{\phi}(\mathbf{x}, t), \hat{\phi}(\mathbf{y}, t)\right] = 0$, so the second term drops out. Taking the second time derivative:

$$\partial_{x^0}^2 T \left\{ \hat{\phi}(x) \hat{\phi}(y) \right\} = T \left\{ \ddot{\hat{\phi}}(x) \hat{\phi}(y) \right\} + \delta\left(x^0 - y^0\right) \left[\dot{\hat{\phi}}(x), \hat{\phi}(y)\right].$$

Here, the Schwinger action principle (via the canonical commutation relations derived from it) dictates:

$$\left[\dot{\hat{\phi}}(\mathbf{x}, t), \hat{\phi}(\mathbf{y}, t)\right] = -i \delta^{(3)}(\mathbf{x} - \mathbf{y}).$$

Therefore:

$$\left(\partial_{x^0}^2 - \nabla_x^2\right) T \left\{ \hat{\phi}(x) \hat{\phi}(y) \right\} = T \left\{ \left[\square_x\hat{\phi}(x)\right] \hat{\phi}(y) \right\} - i \delta^{(4)}(x - y).$$

Generalizing this to $n$ fields inside the time-ordered product, the differential operator generates a sum of delta functions for each argument $x_k$:

$$\square_x \left\langle T \left\{ \hat{\phi}(x) \hat{\phi}(x_1) \cdots \hat{\phi}(x_n) \right\} \right\rangle =
\left\langle T \left\{ \left[\square_x \hat{\phi}(x)\right] \hat{\phi}(x_1) \cdots \hat{\phi}(x_n) \right\} \right\rangle
- i \sum_{j=1}^n \delta^{(4)}\left(x - x_j\right) \left\langle T \left\{ \hat{\phi}(x_1) \cdots \hat{\phi}\left(x_{j-1}\right) \hat{\phi}\left(x_{j+1}\right) \cdots \hat{\phi}(x_n) \right\} \right\rangle.$$

=== The Schwinger–Dyson equation ===
Substituting the operator equation of motion $\square \hat{\phi} = -V'\left(\hat{\phi}\right)$ into the expression above yields the classical field equation inside the correlation function, modified by quantum contact terms:

$$\square_x G_{n+1}(x, x_1, \ldots, x_n) + \left\langle T \left\{ V'\left(\hat{\phi}(x)\right) \hat{\phi}(x_1) \cdots \hat{\phi}(x_n) \right\} \right\rangle =
- i \sum_{j=1}^n \delta^{(4)}\left(x - x_j\right) G_{n-1}\left(x_1, \ldots, \hat{x}_j, \ldots, x_n\right).$$

In the functional source formalism, where correlations are derivatives of the generating functional $Z[J]$, the field $\hat{\phi}(x)$ inside the time-ordered product is replaced by the functional derivative $\frac{1}{i}\frac{\delta}{\delta J(x)}$. This allows the SDE to be written compactly as a functional differential equation for $Z[J]$:

$$\left[ \square_x \left( \frac{1}{i} \frac{\delta}{\delta J(x)} \right) + V'\left( \frac{1}{i} \frac{\delta}{\delta J(x)} \right) \right] Z[J] = J(x) Z[J].$$

This derivation demonstrates that the SDEs are a consequence of the equations of motion combined with the non-commutativity of time-ordered operators, derived strictly within the operator framework.

== See also ==
- Source field
