= Effective action =

Quantum version of the classical action

In quantum field theory, the quantum effective action is a modified expression for the classical action taking into account quantum corrections while ensuring that the principle of least action applies, meaning that extremizing the effective action yields the equations of motion for the vacuum expectation values of the quantum fields. The effective action also acts as a generating functional for one-particle irreducible correlation functions. The potential component of the effective action is called the effective potential, with the expectation value of the true vacuum being the minimum of this potential rather than the classical potential, making it important for studying spontaneous symmetry breaking.

It was first defined perturbatively by Jeffrey Goldstone, Abdus Salam and Steven Weinberg in 1962, while the non-perturbative definition was introduced by Bryce DeWitt in 1963 and independently by Giovanni Jona-Lasinio in 1964.

The article describes the effective action for a single scalar field, however, similar results exist for multiple scalar or fermionic fields.

== Generating functionals ==
These generating functionals also have applications in statistical mechanics and information theory, with slightly different factors of $i$ and sign conventions.

A quantum field theory with action $S[\phi]$ can be fully described in the path integral formalism using the partition functional

$$Z[J] = \int \mathcal D \phi e^{iS[\phi] + i \int d^4 x \phi(x)J(x)}.$$

Since it corresponds to vacuum-to-vacuum transitions in the presence of a classical external current $J(x)$, it can be evaluated perturbatively as the sum of all connected and disconnected Feynman diagrams. It is also the generating functional for correlation functions

$$\langle \hat \phi(x_1) \dots \hat \phi(x_n)\rangle = (-i)^n \frac{1}{Z[J]} \frac{\delta^n Z[J]}{\delta J(x_1) \dots \delta J(x_n)}\bigg|_{J=0},$$

where the scalar field operators are denoted by $\hat \phi(x)$. One can define another useful generating functional $W[J] = -i\ln Z[J]$ responsible for generating connected correlation functions

$$\langle \hat \phi(x_1) \cdots \hat \phi(x_n)\rangle_{\text{con}} = (-i)^{n-1}\frac{\delta^n W[J]}{\delta J(x_1) \dots \delta J(x_n)}\bigg|_{J=0},$$

which is calculated perturbatively as the sum of all connected diagrams. Here connected is interpreted in the sense of the cluster decomposition, meaning that the correlation functions approach zero at large spacelike separations. General correlation functions can always be written as a sum of products of connected correlation functions.

The quantum effective action is defined using the Legendre transformation of $W[J]$

$\Gamma[\phi] = W[J_\phi] - \int d^4 x J_\phi(x) \phi(x),$

where $J_\phi$ is the source current for which the scalar field has the expectation value $\phi(x)$, often called the classical field, defined implicitly as the solution to

Example of a diagram that is not one-particle irreducible.

Example of a diagram that is one-particle irreducible.

$$\phi(x) = \langle \hat \phi(x)\rangle_J = \frac{\delta W[J]}{\delta J(x)}.$$

As an expectation value, the classical field can be thought of as the weighted average over quantum fluctuations in the presence of a current $J(x)$ that sources the scalar field. Taking the functional derivative of the Legendre transformation with respect to $\phi(x)$ yields

$$J_\phi(x) = -\frac{\delta \Gamma[\phi]}{\delta \phi(x)}.$$

In the absence of a source $J_\phi(x) = 0$, the above shows that the vacuum expectation value of the fields extremize the quantum effective action rather than the classical action. This is nothing more than the principle of least action in the full quantum field theory. The reason for why the quantum theory requires this modification comes from the path integral perspective since all possible field configurations contribute to the path integral, while in classical field theory only the classical configurations contribute.

The effective action is also the generating functional for one-particle irreducible (1PI) correlation functions. 1PI diagrams are connected graphs that cannot be disconnected into two pieces by cutting a single internal line. Therefore, we have

$$\langle \hat \phi(x_1) \dots \hat \phi(x_n)\rangle_{\mathrm{1PI}} = i \frac{\delta^n \Gamma[\phi]}{\delta \phi(x_1) \dots \delta \phi(x_n)}\bigg|_{J=0},$$

with $\Gamma[\phi]$ being the sum of all 1PI Feynman diagrams. The close connection between $W[J]$ and $\Gamma[\phi]$ means that there are a number of very useful relations between their correlation functions. For example, the two-point correlation function, which is nothing less than the propagator $\Delta(x,y)$, is the inverse of the 1PI two-point correlation function

$$\Delta(x,y) = \frac{\delta^2 W[J]}{\delta J(x)\delta J(y)} = \frac{\delta \phi(x)}{\delta J(y)} = \bigg(\frac{\delta J(y)}{\delta \phi(x)}\bigg)^{-1} = -\bigg(\frac{\delta^2 \Gamma[\phi]}{\delta \phi(x)\delta \phi(y)}\bigg)^{-1} = -\Pi^{-1}(x,y).$$

== Methods for calculating the effective action ==
A direct way to calculate the effective action $\Gamma[\phi_0]$ perturbatively as a sum of 1PI diagrams is to sum over all 1PI vacuum diagrams acquired using the Feynman rules derived from the shifted action $S[\phi+\phi_0]$. This works because any place where $\phi_0$ appears in any of the propagators or vertices is a place where an external $\phi$ line could be attached. This is very similar to the background field method which can also be used to calculate the effective action.

Alternatively, the one-loop approximation to the action can be found by considering the expansion of the partition function around the classical vacuum expectation value field configuration $\phi(x) = \phi_{\text{cl}}(x) +\delta \phi(x)$, yielding

$$\Gamma[\phi_{\text{cl}}] = S[\phi_{\text{cl}}]+\frac{i}{2}\text{Tr}\bigg[\ln \frac{\delta^2 S[\phi]}{\delta \phi(x)\delta \phi(y)}\bigg|_{\phi = \phi_{\text{cl}}} \bigg]+\cdots.$$

== Symmetries ==
Symmetries of the classical action $S[\phi]$ are not automatically symmetries of the quantum effective action $\Gamma[\phi]$. If the classical action has a continuous symmetry depending on some functional $F[x,\phi]$

$$\phi(x) \rightarrow \phi(x) + \epsilon F[x,\phi],$$

then this directly imposes the constraint

$$0 = \int d^4 x \langle F[x,\phi]\rangle_{J_\phi}\frac{\delta \Gamma[\phi]}{\delta \phi(x)}.$$

This identity is an example of a Slavnov–Taylor identity. It is identical to the requirement that the effective action is invariant under the symmetry transformation

$$\phi(x) \rightarrow \phi(x) + \epsilon \langle F[x,\phi]\rangle_{J_\phi}.$$

This symmetry is identical to the original symmetry for the important class of linear symmetries

$$F[x,\phi] = a(x)+\int d^4 y \ b(x,y)\phi(y).$$

For non-linear functionals the two symmetries generally differ because the average of a non-linear functional is not equivalent to the functional of an average.

== Convexity ==
The apparent effective potential $V_0(\phi)$ acquired via perturbation theory must be corrected to the true effective potential $V(\phi)$, shown via dashed lines in region where the two disagree.

For a spacetime with volume $\mathcal V_4$, the effective potential is defined as $V(\phi) = - \Gamma[\phi]/\mathcal V_4$. With a Hamiltonian $H$, the effective potential $V(\phi)$ at $\phi(x)$ always gives the minimum of the expectation value of the energy density $\langle \Omega|H|\Omega\rangle$ for the set of states $|\Omega\rangle$ satisfying $\langle\Omega| \hat \phi| \Omega\rangle = \phi(x)$. This definition over multiple states is necessary because multiple different states, each of which corresponds to a particular source current, may result in the same expectation value. It can further be shown that the effective potential is necessarily a convex function $V''(\phi) \geq 0$.

Calculating the effective potential perturbatively can sometimes yield a non-convex result, such as a potential that has two local minima. However, the true effective potential is still convex, becoming approximately linear in the region where the apparent effective potential fails to be convex. The contradiction occurs in calculations around unstable vacua since perturbation theory necessarily assumes that the vacuum is stable. For example, consider an apparent effective potential $V_0(\phi)$ with two local minima whose expectation values $\phi_1$ and $\phi_2$ are the expectation values for the states $|\Omega_1\rangle$ and $|\Omega_2\rangle$, respectively. Then any $\phi$ in the non-convex region of $V_0(\phi)$ can also be acquired for some $\lambda \in [0,1]$ using

$$|\Omega\rangle \propto \sqrt \lambda |\Omega_1\rangle+\sqrt{1-\lambda}|\Omega_2\rangle.$$

However, the energy density of this state is $\lambda V_0(\phi_1)+ (1-\lambda)V_0(\phi_2)<V_0(\phi)$ meaning $V_0(\phi)$ cannot be the correct effective potential at $\phi$ since it did not minimize the energy density. Rather the true effective potential $V(\phi)$ is equal to or lower than this linear construction, which restores convexity.

== See also ==
- Background field method
- Correlation function
- Path integral formulation
- Renormalization group
- Spontaneous symmetry breaking
