= Schwinger model =

Quantum electrodynamics in 1+1 dimensions

In quantum field theory, the Schwinger model is a model describing 1+1D (time + 1 spatial dimension) quantum electrodynamics (QED) which includes electrons, coupled to photons. It is named after Julian Schwinger who developed it in 1962.

The model defines the usual QED Lagrangian density

$$\mathcal{L} = - \frac{1}{4g^2}F_{\mu \nu}F^{\mu \nu} + \bar{\psi} (i \gamma^\mu D_\mu -m) \psi$$

over a spacetime with one spatial dimension and one temporal dimension. Where $F_{\mu \nu} = \partial_\mu A_\nu - \partial_\nu A_\mu$ is the photon field strength with symmetry group $\mathrm{U}(1)$ (unitary group), $D_\mu = \partial_\mu - iA_\mu$ is the gauge covariant derivative, $\psi$ is the fermion spinor, $m$ is the fermion mass and $\gamma^0, \gamma^1$ form the two-dimensional representation of the Clifford algebra.

This model exhibits confinement of the fermions and as such, is a toy model for quantum chromodynamics. A handwaving argument why this is so is because in two dimensions, classically, the potential between two charged particles goes linearly as $r$, instead of $1/r$ in 4 dimensions, 3 spatial, 1 time. This model also exhibits a spontaneous symmetry breaking of the U(1) symmetry due to a chiral condensate due to a pool of instantons. The photon in this model becomes a massive particle at low temperatures. This model can be solved exactly and is used as a toy model for other more complex theories.
