= X (charge) =

Quantum number associated with certain grand unification theories

In particle physics, the X charge (or simply X) is a conserved quantum number associated with the SO(10) grand unification theory. It is thought to be conserved in strong, weak, electromagnetic, gravitational, and Higgs interactions. Because the X charge is related to the weak hypercharge, it varies depending on the helicity of a particle. For example, a left-handed quark has an X charge of +1, whereas a right-handed quark can have either an X charge of −1 (for up, charm and top quarks), or −3 (for down, strange and bottom quarks).

X is related to the difference between the baryon number B and the lepton number L (that is, B – L), and the weak hypercharge Y_{W} via the relation:
$$X = 5(B - L) - 2\,Y_\text{W}.$$

== X charge in proton decay ==
Proton decay is a hypothetical form of radioactive decay, predicted by many grand unification theories. During proton decay, the common baryonic proton decays into lighter subatomic particles. However, proton decay has never been experimentally observed and is predicted to be mediated by hypothetical X and Y bosons. Many protonic decay modes have been predicted, one of which is shown below:
$$\mathrm{p}^{+} \longrightarrow \mathrm{e}^{+} + \pi^0$$

This form of decay violates the conservation of both baryon number and lepton number, however the X charge is conserved. Similarly, all experimentally confirmed forms of decay also conserve the X charge value.

== Values of X charge for known elementary particles ==
The following table lists the X charge values for the Standard Model fermions and their antiparticles. Note that the CP conjugate of a fermion has the opposite X charge (e.g. e_{L} vs. e̅_{R}, X = −3 vs. +3).

Particle name	Symbol	Left-handed X charge	Right-handed X charge
Up quark	u	+1	−1
Charm quark	c	+1	−1
Top quark	t	+1	−1
Down quark	d	+1	+3
Strange quark	s	+1	+3
Bottom quark	b	+1	+3
Electron	e^{−}	−3	−1
Muon	μ^{−}	−3	−1
Tauon	τ^{−}	−3	−1
Electron neutrino	ν_{e}	−3	−5
Muon neutrino	ν_{μ}	−3	−5
Tau neutrino	ν_{τ}	−3	−5
Up antiquark	u̅	+1	−1
Charm antiquark	c̅	+1	−1
Top antiquark	t̅	+1	−1
Down antiquark	d̅	−3	−1
Strange antiquark	s̅	−3	−1
Bottom antiquark	b̅	−3	−1
Positron	e^{+}	+1	+3
Antimuon	μ^{+}	+1	+3
Antitau	τ^{+}	+1	+3
Electron antineutrino	ν̅_{e}	+5	+3
Muon antineutrino	ν̅_{μ}	+5	+3
Tau antineutrino	ν̅_{τ}	+5	+3

The next table gives the X charge of the Standard Model bosons.

Particle name	Symbol	X-charge
Photon	γ	0
W boson	W	0
Z boson	Z	0
Gluon	g	0
Higgs boson	H^{0}	−2

Although not part of the Standard Model, the GUT X and Y bosons also have zero X charge.

== See also ==
- Standard Model (mathematical formulation)
- Noether's theorem
- X and Y bosons
