= X and Y bosons =

Hypothetical elementary particles

X^{±} and Y^{±} bosons
- Composition: Elementary particle
- Statistics: Bosonic
- Family: Gauge boson
- Status: Hypothetical
- Types: 12
- Mass: ≈ 10^{15} GeV/c^{2}
- Decays into: X: two quarks, or one antiquark and one charged antilepton Y: two quarks, or one antiquark and one charged antilepton, or one antiquark and one antineutrino
- Electric charge: X: ±4/3 e Y: ±1/3 e
- Color charge: triplet or antitriplet
- Spin: 1
- Spin states: 3
- Weak isospin projection: X: ±1/2; Y: ∓1/2
- Weak hypercharge: ±5/3
- B − L: ±2/3
- X: 0

In particle physics, the X and Y bosons (sometimes collectively called "X bosons") are hypothetical elementary particles analogous to the W and Z bosons, but corresponding to a unified force predicted by the Georgi–Glashow model, a Grand Unified Theory (GUT).

Since the X and Y boson mediate the grand unified force, they would have unusually high mass, which requires more energy to create than the reach of any current particle collider experiment. Significantly, the X and Y bosons couple quarks (constituents of protons and others) to leptons (such as positrons), allowing violation of the conservation of baryon number thus permitting proton decay.

However, the Super-Kamiokande has put a lower bound on the proton's half-life as around 10^{34} years. Since some grand unified theories such as the Georgi–Glashow model predict a half-life less than this, the existence of X and Y bosons, as formulated by this particular model, remains hypothetical.

== Details ==
An X boson would have the following two decay modes:

- X^{+} → u_{L} + u_{R}
- X^{+} → e^{+}_{L} + d̅_{R}

where the two decay products in each process have opposite chirality, u is an up quark, d̅ is a down antiquark, and e^{+} is a positron.

A Y boson would have the following three decay modes:

- Y^{+} → e^{+}_{L} + u̅_{R}
- Y^{+} → d_{L} + u_{R}
- Y^{+} → d̅_{L} + ν̅_{e}_{R}

where u̅ is an up antiquark and ν̅_{e} is an electron antineutrino.

The first product of each decay has left-handed chirality and the second has right-handed chirality, which always produces one fermion with the same handedness that would be produced by the decay of a W boson, and one fermion with contrary handedness ("wrong handed").

Similar decay products exist for the other quark–lepton generations.

In these reactions, neither the lepton number (L) nor the baryon number (B) is separately conserved, but the combination B − L is. Different branching ratios between the X boson and its antiparticle (as is the case with the kaon) would explain baryogenesis. For instance, if an X^{+} / X^{−} pair is created out of energy, and they follow the two branches described above:

- X^{+} → u_{L} + u_{R} ,
- X^{−} → d_{L} + e^{−}_{R} ;

re-grouping the result ( u + u + d ) + e^{−} = p + e^{−} shows it to be a hydrogen atom.

=== Origin ===
The X^{±} and Y^{±} bosons are defined respectively as the six Q = ± 4/3 and the six Q = ± 1/3 components of the final two terms of the adjoint 24 representation of SU(5) as it transforms under the standard model's group:
$$\mathbf{24}\rightarrow (8,1)_0\oplus (1,3)_0\oplus (1,1)_0\oplus (3,2)_{-\frac{5}{6}}\oplus (\bar{3},2)_{\frac{5}{6}}.$$

The positively-charged X and Y carry anti-color charges (equivalent to having two different normal color charges), while the negatively-charged X and Y carry normal color charges, and the signs of the Y bosons' weak isospins are always opposite the signs of their electric charges. In terms of their action on $\mathbb{C}^5,$ X bosons rotate between a color index and the weak isospin-up index, while Y bosons rotate between a color index and the weak isospin-down index.

== See also ==
- B − L
- Grand Unified Theory
- Leptoquark
- Proton decay
- W′ and Z′ bosons
- List of hypothetical particles
