= Leptoquark =

Hypothetical particle

In physics, leptoquarks are hypothetical particles that would interact with quarks and leptons. Leptoquarks are color-triplet bosons that carry both lepton and baryon numbers. Their other quantum numbers, like spin, (fractional) electric charge and weak isospin vary among models. Leptoquarks are encountered in various extensions of the Standard Model, such as technicolor theories, theories of quark–lepton unification (e.g., Pati–Salam model), or Grand Unified Theories based on SU(5), SO(10), E_{6}, etc. Leptoquarks are currently searched for in experiments ATLAS and CMS at the Large Hadron Collider in CERN.

In March 2021, there were some reports to hint at the possible existence of leptoquarks as an unexpected difference in how bottom quarks decay to create electrons or muons. The measurement had been made at a statistical significance of 3.1σ, which is well below the 5σ level that is usually considered a discovery. In 2022, this was retracted by the LHCb collaboration after further analysis and experiments in 2025 confirmed the experiment's agreement with the standard model.

== Overview ==
Leptoquarks, if they exist, must be heavier than any of the currently known elementary particles, otherwise they would have already been discovered. Current experimental lower limits on leptoquark mass (depending on their type) are around 1 TeV/c^{2} (i.e., about 1000 times the proton mass). By definition, leptoquarks decay directly into a quark and a lepton or an antilepton. Like most of other elementary particles, they live for a very short time and are not present in ordinary matter. However, they might be produced in high energy particle collisions such as in particle colliders or from cosmic rays hitting the Earth's atmosphere.

Like quarks, leptoquarks must carry color and therefore must also interact with gluons. This strong interaction of theirs is important for their production in hadron colliders (such as the Tevatron or LHC).

== Simplified typology ==
Several kinds of leptoquarks, depending on their electric charge, can be considered:

- Q = 5/3: Such a leptoquark decays into up-type quarks (up, charm, top) and charged antileptons (e^{+}, μ^{+}, τ^{+}).
- Q = 2/3: Such a leptoquark decays into up-type quarks and neutrinos (or antineutrinos), and/or to down-type quarks (down, strange, bottom) and charged antileptons.
- Q = −1/3: Such a leptoquark decays into down-type quarks and (anti)neutrinos, and/or to up-type quark and a charged lepton.
- Q = −4/3: Such a leptoquark decays into down-type quarks and charged leptons.

If a leptoquark with a given charge exists, its antiparticle with an opposite charge and which would decay into conjugated states to those listed above, must exist as well.

A leptoquark with given electric charge may, in general, interact with any combination of a lepton and quark with given electric charges (this yields up to 3 × 3 = 9 distinct interactions of a single type of a leptoquark). However, experimental searches usually assume that only one of those "channels" is possible. Especially, a Q = 2/3 charged leptoquark that decays into a positron and a down quark is called a "first generation leptoquark", a leptoquark that decays into strange quark and antimuon is a "second-generation leptoquark" etc. Nevertheless, most theories do not bring much of a theoretical motivation to believe that leptoquarks have only a single interaction and that the generation of the quark and lepton involved is the same.

== Proton decay ==
Existence of pure leptoquarks would not spoil the baryon number conservation. However, some theories allow (or require) the leptoquark to also have a diquark interaction vertex. For example, a Q = 2/3 charged leptoquark might also decay into two down-type antiquarks. Existence of such a leptoquark-diquark would cause protons to decay. The current limits on proton lifetime are strong probes of existence of these leptoquark-diquarks. These fields emerge in Grand Unified Theories; for example, in the Georgi–Glashow SU(5) model, they are called X and Y bosons.

== Experimental searches ==
In 1997, an excess of events at the HERA accelerator created a stir in the particle physics community, because one possible explanation of the excess was the involvement of leptoquarks. However, later studies performed both at HERA and at the Tevatron with larger samples of data ruled out this possibility for masses of the leptoquark up to around 275–325 GeV/c^{2}. Second generation leptoquarks were also looked for and not found.

Current best limits on leptoquarks are set by LHC, which has been searching for the first, second, and third generation of leptoquarks and some mixed-generation leptoquarks and have raised the lower mass limit to about 1 TeV/c^{2}. For leptoquarks coupling to a neutrino and a quark to be proven to exist, the missing energy in particle collisions attributed to neutrinos would have to be excessively energetic. It is likely that the creation of leptoquarks would mimic the creation of massive quarks.

For leptoquarks coupling to electrons and up or down quarks, experiments of atomic parity violation and parity-violating electron scattering set the best limits.

The LHeC project to add an electron ring to collide bunches with the existing LHC proton ring is proposed as a project to look for higher-generation leptoquarks.

== See also ==
- X and Y bosons
- Quark–lepton complementarity
