= Sterile neutrino =

Hypothetical particle that interacts only via gravity

Sterile neutrino, right-handed neutrino
- Composition: elementary particle
- Statistics: fermionic
- Family: lepton
- Generation: unknown
- Interactions: gravity; other potential unknown interactions
- Status: Hypothetical
- Types: unknown
- Mass: unknown
- Electric charge: 0 e
- Color charge: none
- Spin: 1/2 ħ
- Spin states: 2
- Weak isospin projection: 0
- Weak hypercharge: 0
- Chirality: right-handed
- B − L: depends on L charge assignment
- X: −5

Sterile neutrinos (or inert neutrinos) are hypothetical particles (neutral leptons – neutrinos) that interact only via gravity and not via any of the other fundamental interactions of the Standard Model. The term sterile neutrino is used to distinguish them from the known, ordinary active neutrinos in the Standard Model, which carry an isospin charge of ± 1/ 2 and engage in the weak interaction. The term typically refers to neutrinos with right-handed chirality, which may be inserted into the Standard Model. Particles that possess the quantum numbers of sterile neutrinos and masses great enough such that they do not interfere with the current theory of Big Bang nucleosynthesis are often called neutral heavy leptons (NHLs) or heavy neutral leptons (HNLs).

The existence of right-handed neutrinos is theoretically well-motivated, because the known active neutrinos are left-handed and all other known fermions have been observed with both left and right chirality. They could also provide a natural explanation of the small active neutrino masses that are inferred from neutrino oscillation. The mass of the right-handed neutrinos themselves is unknown and could have any value between 10^{15} GeV/c^{2} and less than 1 eV/c^{2}. To comply with theories of leptogenesis and dark matter, there must be at least 3 flavors of sterile neutrinos (if they exist). This is in contrast to the number of active neutrino types required to ensure that the electroweak interaction is free of anomalies, which must be exactly 3: the number of charged leptons and quark generations.

The search for sterile neutrinos is an active area of particle physics. If they exist and their mass is smaller than the energies of particles in the experiment, they can be produced in the laboratory, either by mixing between active and sterile neutrinos or in high energy particle collisions. If they are heavier, the only directly observable consequence of their existence would be the observed active neutrino masses. They may, however, be responsible for a number of unexplained phenomena in physical cosmology and astrophysics, including dark matter, baryogenesis or hypothetical dark radiation. In May 2018, physicists of the MiniBooNE experiment reported a stronger neutrino oscillation signal than expected, a possible hint of sterile neutrinos. However, results of the MicroBooNE experiment showed no evidence of sterile neutrinos in October 2021.

== Motivation ==
Experimental results show that all produced and observed neutrinos have left-handed helicities (spin antiparallel to momentum), and all antineutrinos have right-handed helicities, within the margin of error. In the massless limit, it means that only one of two possible chiralities is observed for either particle. These are the only helicities (and chiralities) allowed in the Standard Model of particle interactions; particles with the contrary helicities are explicitly excluded from the formulas.

Recent observations, including neutrino oscillation, have shown that neutrinos have a nonzero mass, which is not predicted by the Standard Model and suggests new, unknown physics. This unexpected mass explains neutrinos with right-handed helicity and antineutrinos with left-handed helicity: Since they do not move at the speed of light, their helicity is not relativistic invariant (it is possible to move faster than them and observe the opposite helicity). Yet all neutrinos have been observed with left-handed chirality, and all antineutrinos right-handed. (See Chirality (physics) § Chirality and helicity for the difference.)

Chirality is a fundamental property of particles and is relativistically invariant: It is the same regardless of the particle's speed and mass in every inertial reference frame. However, a particle with mass that starts out with left-handed chirality can develop a right-handed component as it travels – unless it is massless, chirality is not conserved during the propagation of a free particle through space (nominally, through interaction with the Higgs field).

The question, thus, remains: Do neutrinos and antineutrinos differ only in their chirality? Or do exotic right-handed neutrinos and left-handed antineutrinos exist as separate particles from the common left-handed neutrinos and right-handed antineutrinos?

== Properties ==
Such particles would belong to a singlet representation with respect to the strong interaction and the weak interaction, having zero electric charge, zero weak hypercharge, zero weak isospin, and, as with the other leptons, zero color charge, although they are conventionally represented to have a B − L quantum number of −1. If the Standard Model is embedded in a hypothetical SO(10) Grand Unified Theory, they can be assigned an X charge of −5. The left-handed anti-neutrino has a B − L of +1 and an X charge of +5.

Due to the lack of electric charge, hypercharge, and color charge, sterile neutrinos would not interact via the electromagnetic, weak, or strong interactions, making them extremely difficult to detect. They have Yukawa interactions with ordinary leptons and Higgs bosons, which via the Higgs mechanism leads to mixing with ordinary neutrinos.

In experiments involving energies larger than their mass, sterile neutrinos would participate in all processes in which ordinary neutrinos take part, but with a quantum mechanical probability that is suppressed by a small mixing angle. That makes it possible to produce them in experiments, if they are light enough to be within the reach of current particle accelerators.

They would also interact gravitationally due to their mass, and if they are heavy enough, could explain cold dark matter or warm dark matter. In some Grand Unified Theories, such as SO(10), they also interact via gauge interactions which are extremely suppressed at ordinary energies because their SO(10)-derived gauge boson is extremely massive. They do not appear at all in some other Grand Unified Theories, such as the Georgi–Glashow model (i.e., all its SU(5) charges or quantum numbers are zero).

=== Mass ===
All particles are initially massless under the Standard Model, since there are no Dirac mass terms in the Standard Model's Lagrangian. The only mass terms are generated by the Higgs mechanism, which produces nonzero Yukawa couplings between the left-handed components of fermions, the Higgs field, and their right-handed components. This occurs when the SU(2) doublet Higgs field $\phi$ acquires its nonzero vacuum expectation value, $\nu$, spontaneously breaking its SU(2)_{L} × U(1) symmetry, and thus yielding nonzero Yukawa couplings:
$$\mathcal{L}(\psi) =
\bar{\psi}(i\partial\!\!\!/)\psi - G \bar\psi_L \phi \psi_R$$

Such is the case for charged leptons, like the electron, but within the Standard Model the right-handed neutrino does not exist. So absent the sterile right chiral neutrinos to pair up with the left chiral neutrinos, even with Yukawa coupling the active neutrinos remain massless. In other words, there are no mass-generating terms for neutrinos under the Standard Model: For each generation, the model only contains a left-handed neutrino and its antiparticle, a right-handed antineutrino, each of which is produced in weak eigenstates during weak interactions; the "sterile" neutrinos are omitted. (See Standard Model (mathematical formulation) § Neutrino masses for a detailed explanation.)

In the seesaw mechanism, the model is extended to include the missing right-handed neutrinos and left-handed antineutrinos; one of the eigenvectors of the neutrino mass matrix is then hypothesized to be remarkably heavier than the other.

A sterile (right-chiral) neutrino would have the same weak hypercharge, weak isospin, and electric charge as its antiparticle, because all of these are zero and hence are unaffected by sign reversal. (Note: And as with all other particle / anti-particle pairs, the sterile right-chiral neutrino and left-chiral anti-neutrino would also have identical, nonzero mass. Chirality, lepton-number, and flavor (if any) are the only quantum numbers that distinguish a sterile neutrino from a sterile antineutrino. For any charged particle, for example the electron, this is not the case: Its antiparticle, the positron, has opposite electric charge, opposite weak isospin, and opposite chirality, among other opposite charges. Similarly, an up quark has a charge of + 2/3 e and, for example, a color charge of red, while its antiparticle has an electric charge of − 2/3 e and in this example a color charge of anti-red.)

=== Dirac and Majorana terms ===
Sterile neutrinos allow the introduction of a Dirac mass term as usual. This can yield the observed neutrino mass, but it requires that the strength of the Yukawa coupling be much weaker for the electron neutrino than the electron, without explanation. Similar problems (although less severe) are observed in the quark sector, where the top and bottom masses differ by a factor of 40.

Unlike for the left-handed neutrino, a Majorana mass term can be added for a sterile neutrino without violating local symmetries (weak isospin and weak hypercharge) since it has no weak charge. However, this would still violate total lepton number.

It is possible to include both Dirac and Majorana terms; this is done in the seesaw mechanism (below). In addition to satisfying the Majorana equation, if the neutrino were also its own antiparticle, then it would be the first Majorana fermion. In that case, it could annihilate with another neutrino, allowing neutrinoless double beta decay. The other case is that it is a Dirac fermion, which is not its own antiparticle.

To put this in mathematical terms, we have to make use of the transformation properties of particles. For free fields, a Majorana field is defined as an eigenstate of charge conjugation. However, neutrinos interact only via the weak interactions, which are not invariant under charge conjugation (C), so an interacting Majorana neutrino cannot be an eigenstate of C. The generalized definition is: "a Majorana neutrino field is an eigenstate of the CP transformation". Consequently, Majorana and Dirac neutrinos would behave differently under CP transformations (actually Lorentz and CPT transformations). Also, a massive Dirac neutrino would have nonzero magnetic and electric dipole moments, whereas a Majorana neutrino would not. However, the Majorana and Dirac neutrinos are different only if their rest mass is not zero. For Dirac neutrinos, the dipole moments are proportional to mass and would vanish for a massless particle. Both Majorana and Dirac mass terms however can be inserted into the mass Lagrangian.

=== Seesaw mechanism ===
In addition to the left-handed neutrino, which couples to its family charged lepton in weak charged currents, if there is also a right-handed sterile neutrino partner (a weak isosinglet with zero charge) then it is possible to add a Majorana mass term without violating electroweak symmetry.

Both left-handed and right-handed neutrinos could then have mass and handedness which are no longer exactly preserved (thus "left-handed neutrino" would mean that the state is mostly left and "right-handed neutrino" would mean mostly right-handed). To get the neutrino mass eigenstates, we have to diagonalize the general mass matrix $\ M_{\nu}:$
$$M_{\nu} \approx \begin{pmatrix}
0           &  m_\text{D} \\
m_\text{D}  &  M_\text{NHL}
\end{pmatrix}$$
where $M_\text{NHL}$ is the neutral heavy lepton's mass, which is big, and $\ m_\text{D}\$ are intermediate-size mass terms, which interconnect the sterile and active neutrino masses. The matrix nominally assigns active neutrinos zero mass, but the $\ m_\text{D}\$ terms provide a route for some small part of the sterile neutrinos' enormous mass, $M_\text{NHL}$, to "leak into" the active neutrinos.

Apart from empirical evidence, there is also a theoretical justification for the seesaw mechanism in various extensions to the Standard Model. Both Grand Unification Theories (GUTs) and left-right symmetrical models predict the following relation:
$$m_\nu \ll m_\text{D} \ll M_\text{NHL}\ .$$

According to GUTs and left-right models, the right-handed neutrino is extremely heavy: $M_\text{NHL}$ ≈ 10^{5}–10^{12} GeV/c^{2}, while the smaller eigenvalue is approximately given by
$$m_\nu \approx \frac{m_\text{D}^2}{M_\text{NHL}}\ .$$

This is the seesaw mechanism: As the sterile right-handed neutrino gets heavier, the normal left-handed neutrino gets lighter. The left-handed neutrino is a mixture of two Majorana neutrinos, and this mixing process is how sterile neutrino mass is generated.

== Sterile neutrinos as dark matter ==
For a particle to be considered a dark matter candidate, it must have a nonzero mass and no electromagnetic charge. Naturally, neutrinos and neutrino-like particles are of interest in the search for dark matter because they possess both these properties. Observations suggest that there is more cold dark matter (non-relativistic) than hot dark matter (relativistic). The active neutrinos of the Standard Model, having very low mass (and therefore very high speeds) are therefore unlikely to account for all dark matter.

Since no bounds on the mass of sterile neutrinos are known, the possibility that the sterile neutrino is dark matter has not yet been ruled out, as it has for active neutrinos. If dark matter consists of sterile neutrinos then certain constraints can be applied to their properties. Firstly, in order to produce the structure of the universe observed today the mass of the sterile neutrino would need to be on the keV/c^{2} scale, based on parameter space of the remaining supersymmetric models that have not yet been excluded by experiment. Secondly, although it is not required that dark matter be stable, the particles' lifetimes must be longer than the universe's current age. This places an upper bound on the strength of the mixing between sterile and active neutrinos in the seesaw mechanism. From what is known about the particle thus far, the sterile neutrino is a promising dark matter candidate, but as with every other proposed dark matter particle, it has yet to be confirmed to exist.

=== Heavy Neutral Leptons ===
Heavy Neutral Leptons (HNLs) were proposed as a solution to the problem of neutrinos being excluded as dark matter candidates because of their small mass. It was suggested that there is a counterpart to neutrinos, which interacts in the same way but has a considerably larger mass M_{v} ≫ eV. HNLs were among the earliest candidates proposed for dark matter.

The main question surrounding HNLs was whether heavy neutrinos could be produced in the early universe with enough abundance to explain the observed dark matter density. This density could be accounted for by thermal freeze-out, where interactions of these heavy neutrinos with other Standard Model particles establish thermal equilibrium in the hot, dense early universe, with creation and annihilation processes balancing each other. As the universe expanded, these interactions would weaken and become less relevant, eventually depending only on the universe's volume.

Although theoretically very attractive, properties of heavy neutrinos are limited to astrophysical observations, cosmological measurements, and laboratory experiments. Searches for the invisible decays of the Z boson rule out the existence of additional neutrinos. Searches for dark matter scattering place strong constraints on heavier masses. These limitations place significant constraints on heavy versions of ordinary neutrinos as dark matter candidates.

== Detection attempts ==
The production and decay of sterile neutrinos could happen through the mixing with virtual ("off mass shell") neutrinos. There were several experiments set up to discover or observe NHLs, for example the NuTeV (E815) experiment at Fermilab or LEP-L3 at CERN. They all led to establishing limits to observation, rather than actual observation of those particles. If they are indeed a constituent of dark matter, sensitive X-ray detectors would be needed to observe the radiation emitted by their decays.

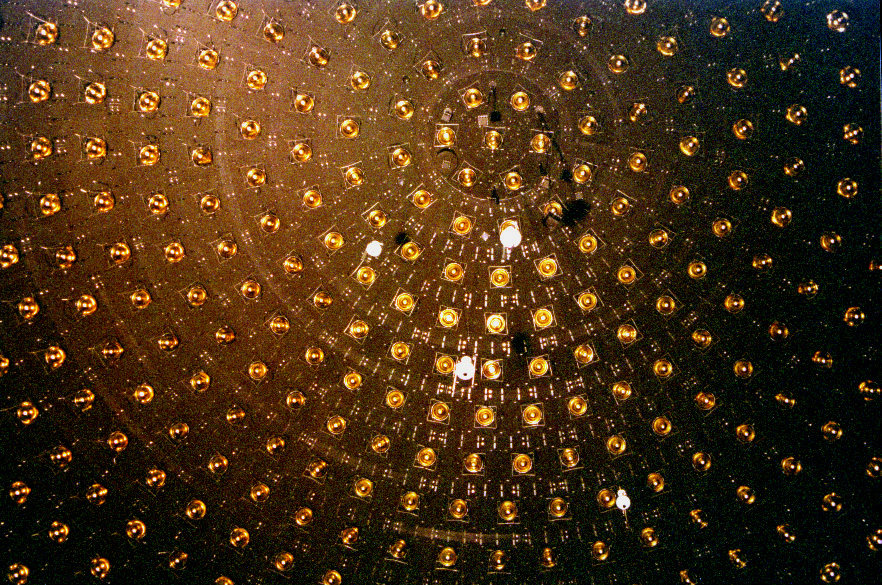
The MiniBooNE detector (interior shown) at Fermilab was created to measure the oscillation of neutrinos.

Sterile neutrinos may mix with ordinary neutrinos via a Dirac mass after electroweak symmetry breaking, in analogy to quarks and charged leptons. Sterile neutrinos and (in more-complicated models) ordinary neutrinos may also have Majorana masses. In the type 1 seesaw mechanism both Dirac and Majorana masses are used to drive ordinary neutrino masses down and make the sterile neutrinos much heavier than the Standard Model's interacting neutrinos. In GUT scale seesaw models the heavy neutrinos can be as heavy as the GUT scale (~ 10^{15} GeV/c^{2}). In other models, such as the νMSM model where their masses are in the keV/c^{2} to GeV/c^{2} range, they could be lighter than the weak gauge bosons W and Z. A light sterile neutrino (with the mass ~ 1 eV/c^{2}) was suggested as a possible explanation of the results of the Liquid Scintillator Neutrino Detector experiment. On 11 April 2007, researchers at the MiniBooNE experiment at Fermilab announced that they had not found any evidence supporting the existence of such a sterile neutrino. More-recent results and analysis have provided some support for the existence of the sterile neutrino.

Two separate detectors near a nuclear reactor in France found 3% of anti-neutrinos missing. They suggested the existence of a fourth neutrino with a mass of 1.2 eV/c^{2}. Daya Bay has also searched for a light sterile neutrino and excluded some mass regions. Daya Bay collaboration measured the anti-neutrino energy spectrum, and found that anti-neutrinos at an energy of around 5 MeV/c^{2} are in excess relative to theoretical expectations. It also recorded 6% missing anti-neutrinos. This could suggest either that sterile neutrinos exist or that our understanding of some other aspect of neutrinos is incomplete.

The number of neutrinos and the masses of the particles can have large-scale effects that shape the appearance of the cosmic microwave background. The total number of neutrino species, for instance, affects the rate at which the cosmos expanded in its earliest epochs: More neutrinos means a faster expansion. The Planck satellite found no significant evidence of sterile neutrinos and largely excluded models with more than one sterile flavor, setting up a tension with lab experiments that consistently find evidence of sterile neutrinos. In 2016, scientists at the IceCube Neutrino Observatory did not find any evidence for the sterile neutrino. However, in May 2018, physicists of the MiniBooNE experiment reported a stronger neutrino oscillation signal than expected, a possible hint of sterile neutrinos.

The experiment Neutrino-4 started in 2014 with a detector model and continued with a full-scale detector in 2016–2021 obtained the result of the direct observation of the oscillation effect at parameter region Δm^{2}_{14} = (7.3 ± 0.13_{st} ± 1.16_{syst}) eV^{2}/c^{4} and sin^{2}2θ_{14} = 0.36 ± 0.12_{stat} (2.9σ). The simulation showed the expected detector signal for the case of oscillation detection.

In June 2022, the BEST experiment released two papers observing a 20%–24% deficit in the production of the isotope germanium expected from the reaction ^{71}Ga + ν_{e} → e^{−} + ^{71}Ge. The so-called "Gallium anomaly" suggests that a sterile neutrino explanation could be consistent with the data.

In January 2023, the STEREO experiment published its final result, reporting the most precise measurement of the antineutrino energy spectrum associated with the fission of uranium-235. The data is consistent with the Standard Model and rejects the hypothesis of a light sterile neutrino with a mass of around 1 eV/c^{2}.

In 2023 results of searches by the CMS set new limits for sterile neutrinos with masses of 2–3 GeV/c^{2}.

In October 2021, the MicroBooNE experiment's first results showed no hints of sterile neutrinos, rather finding the results aligning with the Standard Model's three neutrino flavours. The MicroBooNE collaboration released a new result in December 2025 that effectively excludes the entire single light sterile neutrino model parameter space to a 95% confidence interval. Even though the single light sterile neutrino model cannot explain the LSND and MiniBooNE anomalies, there are still several other sterile neutrino models that have not been ruled out, such as multiple light sterile neutrinos and sterile neutrinos with non-standard interactions.

The ultra-high-energy neutrino event KM3-230213A may provide evidence of sterile neutrinos.

== See also ==
- List of hypothetical particles
- MiniBooNE at Fermilab
- Weakly Interacting Slender Particle

== Sources ==
- Drewes, M. (2013). "The phenomenology of right handed neutrinos". International Journal of Modern Physics E. 22 (8): 1330019–593. arXiv:1303.6912. Bibcode:2013IJMPE..2230019D. doi:10.1142/S0218301313300191. S2CID 119161526.
- Merle, A. (2013). "keV neutrino model building". International Journal of Modern Physics D. 22 (10): 1330020. arXiv:1302.2625. Bibcode:2013IJMPD..2230020M. doi:10.1142/S0218271813300206. S2CID 118550598.
- Vaitaitis, A.G.; et al. (1999). "Search for neutral heavy leptons in a high-energy neutrino beam". Physical Review Letters. 83 (24): 4943–4946. arXiv:hep-ex/9908011. Bibcode:1999PhRvL..83.4943V. doi:10.1103/PhysRevLett.83.4943. S2CID 14328194.
- Formaggio, J.A.; Conrad, J.; Shaevitz, M.; Vaitaitis, A. (1998). "Helicity effects in neutral heavy lepton decays". Physical Review D. 57 (11): 7037–7040. Bibcode:1998PhRvD..57.7037F. doi:10.1103/PhysRevD.57.7037.
- Nakamura, K.; et al. (Particle Data Group) (2010). "Review of Particle Physics". Journal of Physics G. 37 (75021) 075021. Bibcode:2010JPhG...37g5021N. doi:10.1088/0954-3899/37/7A/075021. hdl:10481/34593.
