= Yung-su Tsai =

Taiwan-born American theoretical particle physicist (born 1930)

Yung-su Tsai (born 1 February 1930 in Yuli, Hualien) is a Taiwanese-born American theoretical particle physicist who was a professor at Stanford University and was noted for his work at the SLAC National Accelerator Laboratory and specifically the discovery of the tau lepton.
