= B − L =

Quantum number; the difference between the baryon and lepton numbers

In particle physics, B − L (pronounced "bee minus ell") is a quantum number which is the difference between the baryon number (B) and the lepton number (L) of a quantum system.

== Details ==
This quantum number is the charge of a global/gauge U(1) symmetry in some Grand Unified Theory models, called U(1)_{B−L}. Unlike baryon number alone or lepton number alone, this hypothetical symmetry would not be broken by chiral anomalies or gravitational anomalies, as long as this symmetry is global, which is why this symmetry is often invoked.

If B − L exists as a symmetry, then for the seesaw mechanism to work B − L has to be spontaneously broken to give the neutrinos a nonzero mass.

The anomalies that would break baryon number conservation and lepton number conservation individually cancel in such a way that B − L is always conserved. One hypothetical example is proton decay where a proton (B = 1, L = 0) would decay into a pion (B = 0, L = 0) and positron (B = 0, L = −1).

The weak hypercharge Y_{W} is related to B − L via

$X + 2\,Y_\text{W} = 5\,( B - L ),$

where X charge (not to be confused with the X boson) is the conserved quantum number associated with the global U(1) symmetry Grand Unified Theory.

== See also ==
- Baryogenesis
- Leptogenesis
- Majoron
- Proton decay
- X and Y bosons
- X (charge)
- Leptoquark
