= Weak hypercharge =

Abelian charge found in electroweak theory

In the Standard Model of electroweak interactions of particle physics, the weak hypercharge is a quantum number relating the electric charge and the third component of weak isospin. It is frequently denoted $Y_\mathsf{W}$ and corresponds to the gauge symmetry U(1).

It is conserved (only terms that are overall weak-hypercharge neutral are allowed in the Lagrangian). However, one of the interactions is with the Higgs field. Since the Higgs field vacuum expectation value is nonzero, particles interact with this field all the time even in vacuum. This changes their weak hypercharge (and weak isospin T_{3}). Only a specific combination of them, $\ Q = T_3 + \tfrac{1}{2}\, Y_\mathsf{W}\$ (electric charge), is conserved.

Mathematically, weak hypercharge appears similar to the Gell-Mann–Nishijima formula for the hypercharge of strong interactions (which is not conserved in weak interactions and is zero for leptons).

In the electroweak theory SU(2) transformations commute with U(1) transformations by definition and therefore U(1) charges for the elements of the SU(2) doublet (for example lefthanded up and down quarks) have to be equal. This is why U(1) cannot be identified with U(1)_{em} and weak hypercharge has to be introduced.

Weak hypercharge was first introduced by Sheldon Glashow in 1961.

== Definition ==
Weak hypercharge is the generator of the U(1) component of the electroweak gauge group, SU(2)×U(1) and its associated quantum field B mixes with the W^{3} electroweak quantum field to produce the observed Z gauge boson and the photon of quantum electrodynamics.

The weak hypercharge satisfies the relation

$Q = T_3 + \tfrac{1}{2} Y_\text{W} ~,$

where Q is the electric charge (in elementary charge units) and T_{3} is the third component of weak isospin (the SU(2) component).

Rearranging, the weak hypercharge can be explicitly defined as:

$Y_{\rm W} = 2(Q - T_3)$

Fermion family	Left-chiral fermions				Right-chiral fermions			
Fermion family		Electric charge Q	Weak isospin T_{3}	Weak hyper- charge Y_{W}		Electric charge Q	Weak isospin T_{3}	Weak hyper- charge Y_{W}
Leptons	ν_{e}, ν_{μ}, ν_{τ}	0	+1/2	−1	ν_{R; May not exist}	0	0	0
Leptons	e^{−}, μ^{−}, τ^{−}	−1	−1/2	−1	e^{−}_{R}, μ^{−}_{R}, τ^{−}_{R}	−1	0	−2
Quarks	u, c, t	+2/3	+1/2	+1/3	u_{R}, c_{R}, t_{R}	+2/3	0	+4/3
Quarks	d, s, b	−1/3	−1/2	+1/3	d_{R}, s_{R}, b_{R}	−1/3	0	−2/3

where "left"- and "right"-handed here are left and right chirality, respectively (distinct from helicity). The weak hypercharge for an anti-fermion is the opposite of that of the corresponding fermion because the electric charge and the third component of the weak isospin reverse sign under charge conjugation.

Weinberg angle $~\theta_\mathsf{W}~,$ and relation between coupling constants g, g′, and e. Adapted from Lee (1981).

Interaction mediated	Boson	Electric charge Q	Weak isospin T_{3}	Weak hypercharge Y_{W}
Weak	W^{±}	±1	±1	0
Weak	Z^{0}	0	0	0
Electromagnetic	γ^{0}	0	0	0
Strong	g	0	0	0
Higgs	H^{0}	0	−1/2	+1

The pattern of weak isospin, T_{3}, and weak hypercharge, Y_{W}, of the known elementary particles, showing electric charge, Q , along the Weinberg angle. The neutral Higgs field (circled) breaks the electroweak symmetry and interacts with other particles to give them mass. Three components of the Higgs field become part of the massive W and Z bosons.

The sum of −isospin and +charge is zero for each of the gauge bosons; consequently, all the electroweak gauge bosons have

$\, Y_\text{W} = 0 ~.$

Hypercharge assignments in the Standard Model are determined up to a twofold ambiguity by requiring cancellation of all anomalies.

=== Alternative half-scale ===
For convenience, weak hypercharge is often represented at half-scale, so that

$\, Y_{\rm W} = Q - T_3 ~,$

which is equal to just the average electric charge of the particles in the isospin multiplet.

== Baryon and lepton number ==
Weak hypercharge is related to baryon number minus lepton number via:

$\tfrac{1}{2}X + Y_{\rm W} = \tfrac{5}{2}(B - L) \,$

where X is a conserved quantum number in GUT. Since weak hypercharge is always conserved within the Standard Model and most extensions, this implies that baryon number minus lepton number is also always conserved.

=== Neutron decay ===
n → p + e^{−} + ν̅_{e}

Hence neutron decay conserves baryon number B and lepton number L separately, so also the difference B − L is conserved.

=== Proton decay ===
Proton decay is a prediction of many grand unification theories.
$$\begin{align}
\rm p^+ \longrightarrow e^+ + & \ \pi^0 \\
& \downarrow \\
& 2\gamma
\end{align}$$

Hence this hypothetical proton decay would conserve B − L , even though it would individually violate conservation of both lepton number and baryon number.

== See also ==
- Standard Model (mathematical formulation)
- Weak charge
