= Mutability =

Theory in physics

The principle of mutability is the notion that any physical property which appears to follow a conservation law may undergo some physical process that violates its conservation. John Archibald Wheeler offered this speculative principle after Stephen Hawking predicted the evaporation of black holes which violates baryon number conservation.

== See also ==
- Philosophy of physics
