= Proton decay =

Hypothetical particle decay process of a proton

Diagram of a proton decay into a positron and a neutral pion (p → e^{+} + π^{0})

Proton decay is the key process to test the stability of matter and baryon number conservation and has long been a subject of both theoretical and experimental interests. Violation of baryon number conservation is one of the three key ingredients to explain the asymmetry of matter and antimatter in the Universe, as first formulated by Andrei Sakharov in 1967.

Despite significant experimental effort, proton decay has never been observed. The current experimental lower bound on the proton lifetime ($\tau_p$) is 2.4×10^{34} years (in the decay channel into a positron and a neutral pion: p → e^{+} + π^{0}).

According to the Standard Model, the proton, a type of baryon, is stable because baryon number is conserved. Since protons are the lightest baryons in the model, they cannot decay into other particles on their own and are therefore stable. However, baryon number conservation is an accidental global symmetry of the Standard Model, not associated with any fundamental gauge symmetry, slightly violated by non-perturbative SU(2)_{L} sphaleron effects, negligible at low temperatures but relevant in the early Universe.

Positron emission and electron capture—forms of radioactive decay in which a proton becomes a neutron—are not proton decay, because in these processes the proton interacts with other particles within the atom.

Grand Unified Theories (GUTs) explicitly break the baryon number symmetry, allowing protons to decay via the Higgs particle, magnetic monopoles, or new X bosons with a half-life in the range 10^{31} to 10^{36} years. For comparison, the universe is roughly 1.4×10^{10} (14 billion) years old, which is at least twenty orders of magnitude lower. Although at first glance it may seem nearly impossible to explore such long lifetimes, it is sufficient to monitor 10^{34} protons per year (with efficiency = 1) to be sensitive to average lifetimes of 10^{34} years. About 10^{34} protons are contained in approximately 30 kton of water, slightly more than the fiducial volume of the most sensitive experiment currently in operation, Super-Kamiokande.

The easiest decay channel to detect is the one into a positron and a neutral pion, $p \rightarrow e^+ \pi^0$, a common prediction of many GUT models. This channel has a very clean signature, with no invisible particles in the final state. This allows for full reconstruction of the proton mass from the decay products, and, since it is a two-body decay, the total recoil momentum is expected to be small.

Supersymmetric extensions of GUT models favor the $p \rightarrow \overline{\nu}_\mu K^+$decay channel, which is more difficult to detect in water Cherenkov detectors because the antineutrino leaves the detector undisturbed and the kaon momentum is below the Cherenkov-light production threshold in water. The process can be identified by detecting the muons produced by kaon decays at rest, as well as the gamma rays emitted when a nucleon decays within the oxygen nucleus. The nucleus may remain in an excited state following this decay, from which it rapidly relaxes by emitting gamma rays.

Other processes can enable experiments to test the baryon number conservation, such as neutron-antineutron oscillations and specific nucleon–antinucleon conversion processes, accessible through electron–deuteron scattering.

== History ==
In the Standard Model (SM), matter stability is described by assigning a baryon number B=+1 to the proton (lightest baryon), following Hermann Weyl's 1929 proposed conservation principle. Ernst Stueckelberg formally postulated the baryon number (heavy charge at the time) conservation law in 1939.

In the 1950s it was realized that limits on proton decay were exceedingly long. The very existence of advanced life forms on Earth implied $\tau_p \gtrsim 10^{16}$ yr, in the same paper was quoted a limit $\tau_p \gtrsim 10^{21}$ yr from absent spontaneous ^{232}Th fission induced by nucleon decay. More refined geochemical limits from searches in muscovite for tracks left in geological times by pions from nucleon decay, derived a lower limit $\textstyle \tau_p \gtrsim 2\times10^{27}$ yr. Radiochemical experiments using 1710 kg of underground potassium acetate (KC_{2}H_{3}O_{2}) set a similar limit ($\textstyle \tau_p \gtrsim 10^{26}$ yr) by detecting the ^{39}K→^{38}Ar→^{37}Ar decay chain.

Above the electroweak scale Λ_{EW} (corresponding to the vacuum expectation value of the Higgs field, around 246 GeV), where Standard Model unification occurs, the three fundamental forces have comparable couplings, suggesting unification in Grand Unified Theories (GUTs). Historical models like Pati–Salam model (1973), unifying quarks/leptons and Georgi–Glashow model (1974), unifying all forces and particles/antiparticles, predict B violation via superheavy gauge bosons M_{X}. The natural GUT energy scale Λ_{GUT} is where SM gauge couplings converge, ~10^{15} GeV. This value is approximately thirteen orders of magnitude higher than the electroweak scale, or more than eleven orders of magnitude higher than the energy achievable in experiments conducted at particle accelerators. However, at these energies the estimation of proton decay lifetime is around 10^{29}–10^{31} yr, within reach of dedicated experiments: when GUTs were proposed, the experimental limits were around 10^{30} yr (for decay modes which produce 𝜇 →𝑒 decays). These considerations strongly motivated proton decay searches.

In 1981 was published the first limit by a water Cherenkov detector at the Homestake gold mine, looking for the production and detection of a decaying muon following a nucleon decay event: $\textstyle \tau_p \gtrsim 3\times 10^{31} B_\mu$ yr, where $\textstyle B_\mu$ is the model-dependent probability for this particular decay channel (or branching ratio). In the early 80s several experiments started. Some were based on calorimeter-type detectors, including the particle experiments at Kolar Gold Fields (India), NUSEX (Mont Blanc Tunnel, Italy), Fréjus (Fréjus Road Tunnel, France), Soudan (Minnesota, US); while other were water Cherenkov detectors: IMB (Ohio, US), HPW (Utah, US), KamiokaNDE (Japan).

The IMB experiment published a remarkable limit for the p → e^{+}π^{0} decay channel $\textstyle \tau_p \ge 6.5\times10^{31}$ yr (1983) (from now on the branching ratio term is omitted) and provided the first limit for $p \rightarrow \overline{\nu}_\mu K^+$: $\textstyle \tau_p \ge10^{31}$yr, but in the past 40 years, the experimental scene has been dominated by the KamiokaNDE experiment and its successor Super-Kamiokande.

The construction of KamiokaNDE experiment under the direction of Masatoshi Koshiba was completed in 1983. The detector was a cylindrical tank (16 m in height and 15.6 m in diameter) containing 3,000 tons of pure water, equipped with about 1,000 photomultiplier tubes (PMTs) arranged on the lateral surface. It was located in the Kamioka zinc mine (near the city of Hida, Gifu Prefecture, Japan). The photomultipliers detected Cherenkov light, emitted by charged particles traversing the water at speeds greater than the speed of light in the medium.

KamiokaNDE was able to set stringent lower limits on the proton lifetime ($\tau_p$ > 2.6 × 10^{32} years at 90% confidence level for the p → e^{+} + π^{0} decay channel), thereby ruling out all the simplest Grand Unified Models of elementary particles.

The great success of KamiokaNDE, motivated the collaboration to propose a gigantic upgrade of the detector: Super-Kamiokande, a cylinder 41.4 m tall and 39.3 m in diameter holding 50,220 tonnes of ultrapure water, 17 times more massive than KamiokaNDE. Super-Kamiokande construction began in 1991 and was completed in 1996.

The most updated limits of Super-Kamiokande, still operational, are

- 2.4×10^{34} years for decay to a positron and a neutral pion (p → e^{+} + π^{0}),
- 1.6×10^{34} years for decay to an antimuon and a neutral pion (p → μ^{+}K^{0}),
- 0.59×10^{34} years for decay to a muon antineutrino and a positive kaon (p → ν̄K^{+}).

Two Nobel prizes for neutrino physics were awarded to scientists based on work using experimental facilities originally designed to detect proton decay. In 2002, Masatoshi Koshiba was awarded "for pioneering contributions to astrophysics, in particular for the detection of cosmic neutrinos", by upgrading the KamiokaNDE experiment. (sharing half prize with Raymond Davis Jr. for the same motivations).T. Kajita of the Super-Kamiokane collaboration was awarded the 2015 Nobel Prize "for the discovery of neutrino oscillations, which shows that neutrinos have mass", jointly to Art McDonald of the SNO experiment.

== Planned experimental searches ==
Unsolved problem in physics
Do protons decay? If so, then what is the half-life? Can nuclear binding energy affect this?
More unsolved problems in physics

A third‑generation Kamiokande detector, Hyper‑Kamiokande, is currently under construction and it will be about 5.2 times more massive than Super-Kamiokande (approximately 8 times larger in fiducial volume), designed to start data taking in 2028. It will achieve sensitivities 3–5 times better than Super-Kamiokande after 10 years of data taking.

Other important experiments that will have competitive sensitivities in proton decay searches are JUNO in China (which started data taking in January 2026) and DUNE in the US (designed to start data taking in 2031). These three ambitious projects were originally proposed and funded primarily for neutrino‑oscillation studies, but they will nevertheless be able to probe proton decay with high sensitivity, as summarized in the following table.

Current and projected limits on the proton decay lifetime (90% confidence level) in different decay channels
Mode	Present Limit (10^{34} yr)	Projection (10^{34} yr)
p → e^{+} π^{0}	>2.4 (Super-K)	>7.8 (Hyper-K)
p → ν̄ K^{+}	>0.59 (Super-K)	>3.2 (Hyper-K); >1.3 (DUNE); >1.9 (JUNO)
p → μ^{+} π^{0}	>1.6 (Super-K)	>7.7 (Hyper-K)

The time evolution of the experimental limits in two proton decay channels are shown in the following plot, together with the predictions of different theoretical models.

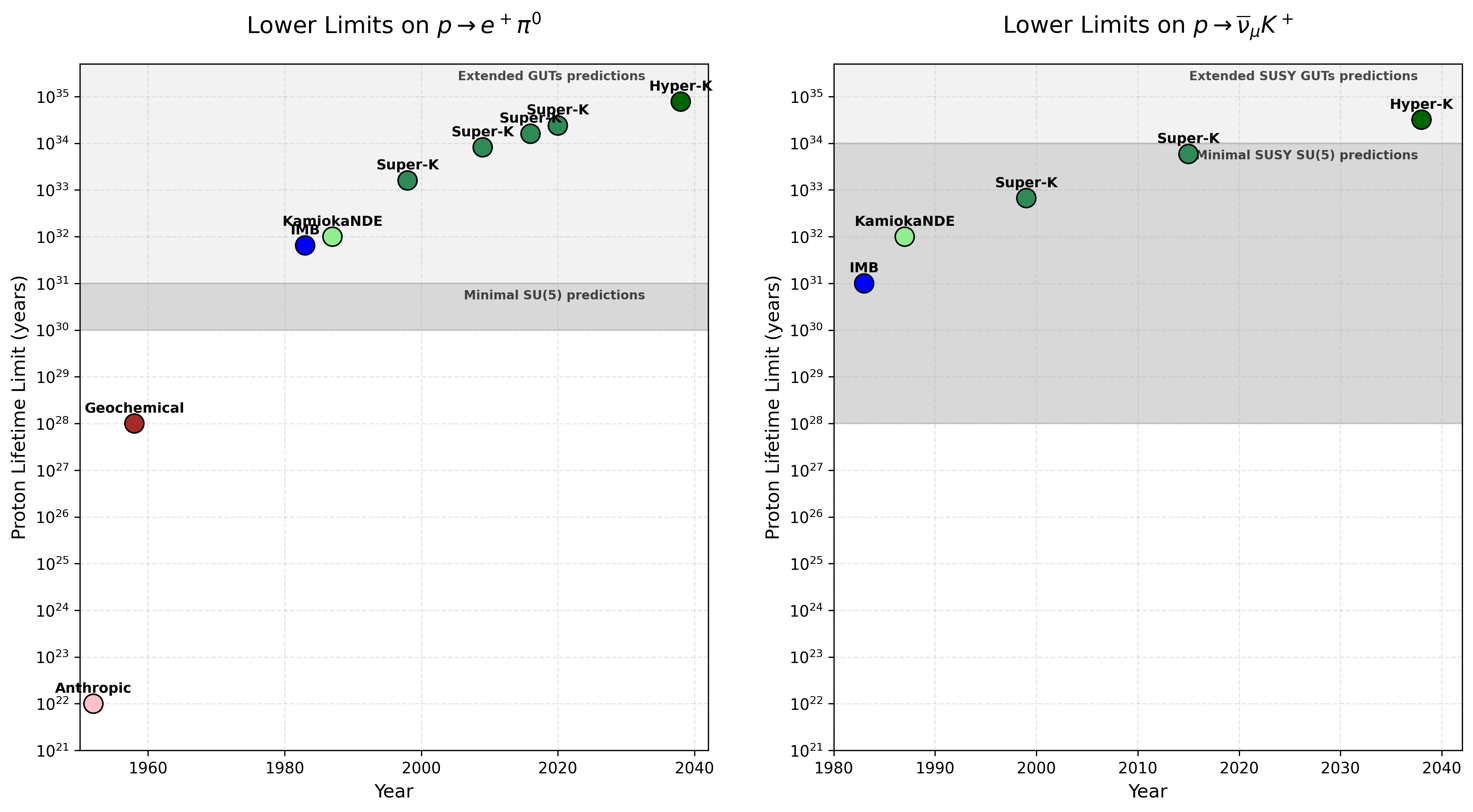
Evolution of the experimental limits on the decay channel (left) and on the decay channel (right), compared with predictions from different GUT models, shown in different levels of grey. The first two points of the left plot are historical inclusive searches; references are in the text.

== Theoretical motivation ==
The core concept of Grand Unified Theories (GUTs) embeds the Standard Model (SM) gauge group $\textstyle SU(3)_C \times SU(2)_L \times U(1)_Y$ into a larger, non-Abelian group $\textstyle G_{GUT}$, unifying them under a single gauge coupling. Crucially, electric charge quantization arises naturally, as the electric charge operator is a generator of $\textstyle G_{GUT}$. The preferred decay channel of those theories is p → e^{+} + π^{0}.

GUT theories find strong support in the convergence of the three Standard Model running coupling constants. These correspond to the fundamental interactions: α_{1} for the electromagnetic (hypercharge) interaction, α_{2} for the weak interaction, and α_{3} for the strong interaction. They follow renormalization group equations: α_{3} increases at low energies (asymptotic freedom below ~1 GeV), while α_{1} and α_{2} decrease, so that they converge, but not exactly meet, at an energy of the order of 10^{15} GeV, which results to be the natural energy scale of GUTs, as it is displayed in the following Figure.

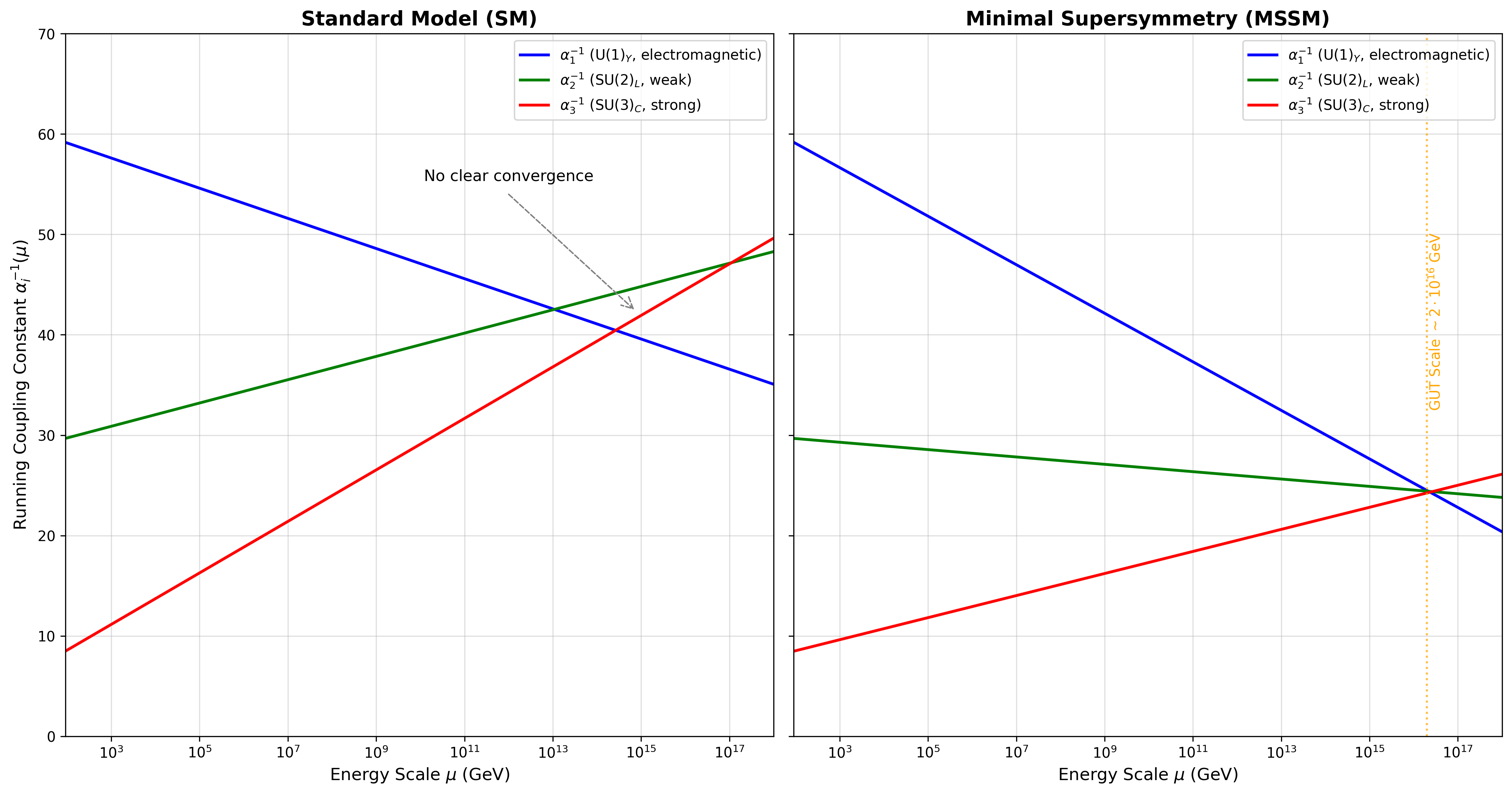
Evolution of the running coupling constants as a function of energy computed with the Standard Model parameters (left panel) and the Minimum Supersymmetric Standard Model (right panel)

In this section, the principal GUT models and their variants are briefly introduced, focusing on their proton decay predictions. For a comprehensive overview of Grand Unified Theories, see the dedicated article: Grand Unified Theory

SU(5): introduced in 1974 by Georgi and Glashow, is the minimal choice for unification in a simple group. One SM generation of particles comes from $\textstyle 10 \oplus \overline{5}$ multiplets of SU(5), and the scale of the grand unified coupling is about 10^{15} GeV. SU(5) provides a rather precise prediction for proton lifetime $\textstyle \tau_p$, thanks to its single symmetry-breaking pattern down to the Standard Model gauge group, given by $\textstyle \tau_P \sim \frac{A M_X^4}{\alpha_g^2 M_P^5}$, where $\textstyle \alpha_g \sim 1/40$ is the grand unified coupling and A contains details of hadronic matrix elements. Assuming M_{X} at the scale of unification $\textstyle \Lambda_{GUT}$, this led to a prediction, in 1981 with the values of the SM parameters as known at the time, of $\textstyle \tau_p \sim 3.2 \cdot 10^{29 \pm 1.3}$ years.

SO(10): While minimal SU(5) requires two separate representations per SM generation (plus, in case, an extra singlet for the seesaw mechanism's right handed neutrino, unconstrained by the GUT scale), SO(10) unifies each generation, including the right handed neutrino singlet, into a single 16-dimensional spinor representation. Several possible multi-step breaking patterns exist from SO(10) to the SM gauge group, rendering proton decay lifetime predictions non-unique and model-dependent.

The three coupling constants are predicted to nicely meet at a single point when Supersymmetry is introduced.

In Supersymmetry (SUSY), each fermion (boson) is duplicated by a boson (fermion) partner. These extra particles slow down the logarithmic energy dependence of the running coupling constants so that the unification mass grows to $\textstyle M_{GUT} \sim 2 \times 10^{16}$GeV, predicting a longer proton lifetime.

However, SUSY also introduces dimension 5 operators that can contribute to proton decay with much shorter decay times. To suppress these contributions extra symmetries are invoked, with the result that decays to quarks and leptons in other generation than (u, d, e, $\textstyle \nu_e$) are favored, for instance $\textstyle p \rightarrow \overline{\nu}_\mu K^+$or $\textstyle p \rightarrow \mu^+ K^0$. SUSY extensions of SO(10) are also possible.

Other possible modifications of SUSY SU(5) that allow longer proton lifetime include Flipped SU(5): $\textstyle SU(5) \rightarrow SU(5) \times U(1)_Y$, where Y is the weak hypercharge, which suppresses in a natural way the dimension 5 operators for the proton decay; or SU(5) in Split SUSY, where the symmetry is broken in the Standard Model at very high scales, with the Higgs mass parameter appearing finely-tuned in the low-energy effective theory. Among the many things, this theory predicts very high values for proton decay.

SUSY SU(5) can be extended to include supergravity or extra dimensions. SUGRA SU(5) is a supersymmetric Grand Unified Theory based on the SU(5) gauge group within the framework of supergravity (SUGRA). Proton lifetime predictions have been computed in SUSY SU(5) from 5 dimensions (5D) models; and in string theory variants using D6-branes and orientifolds.

As a final consideration, while Supersymmetry addresses many interesting theoretical issues, its prediction of the mass of the lightest supersymmetric particles at the TeV scale has been severely matched by the LHC results.

Proton decay lifetime predictions are summarized in the following table. By comparing these predictions with the sensitivities expected from future experiments, it becomes clear that experiments will never be able to rule out the entire vast range of possible models. However, they will cover the bulk of the predicted lifetimes, offering both a strong discovery potential if GUT models are realized in nature and a remarkable capacity to constrain GUT model building.

Proton decay predictions in various GUT models
Model	Modes	τ_{p} (years)
Minimal SU(5)	p → e^{+}π^{0}	10^{30} − 10^{31}
Minimal SUSY SU(5)	p → ν̄K^{+} n → ν̄K^{0}	10^{28} − 10^{34}
Minimal SO(10)	p → e^{+}π^{0}	10^{32} − 10^{36}
SUSY SO(10) (std. d = 5)	p → ν̄K^{+}	10^{33} − 10^{34}
Flipped SU(5)	p → e/μ^{+}π^{0}	10^{35} − 10^{36}
Split SU(5) SUSY	p → e^{+}π^{0}	10^{35} − 10^{37}
SUGRA SU(5)	p → ν̄K^{+}	10^{32} − 10^{34}
SU(5) in 5 dimensions	p → μ^{+}K^{0} p → e^{+}π^{0} p → ν̄K^{+}	10^{34} − 10^{35} 10^{36} − 10^{39}
GUT-like models from Type IIA string with D6-branes	p → e^{+}π^{0}	~ 10^{36}

== Decay operators ==
=== Dimension-6 proton decay operators ===
SU(5) dimension-6 proton decay mediated by an X boson.

SUSY dimension-4 proton decay operator mediated by a virtual squark.

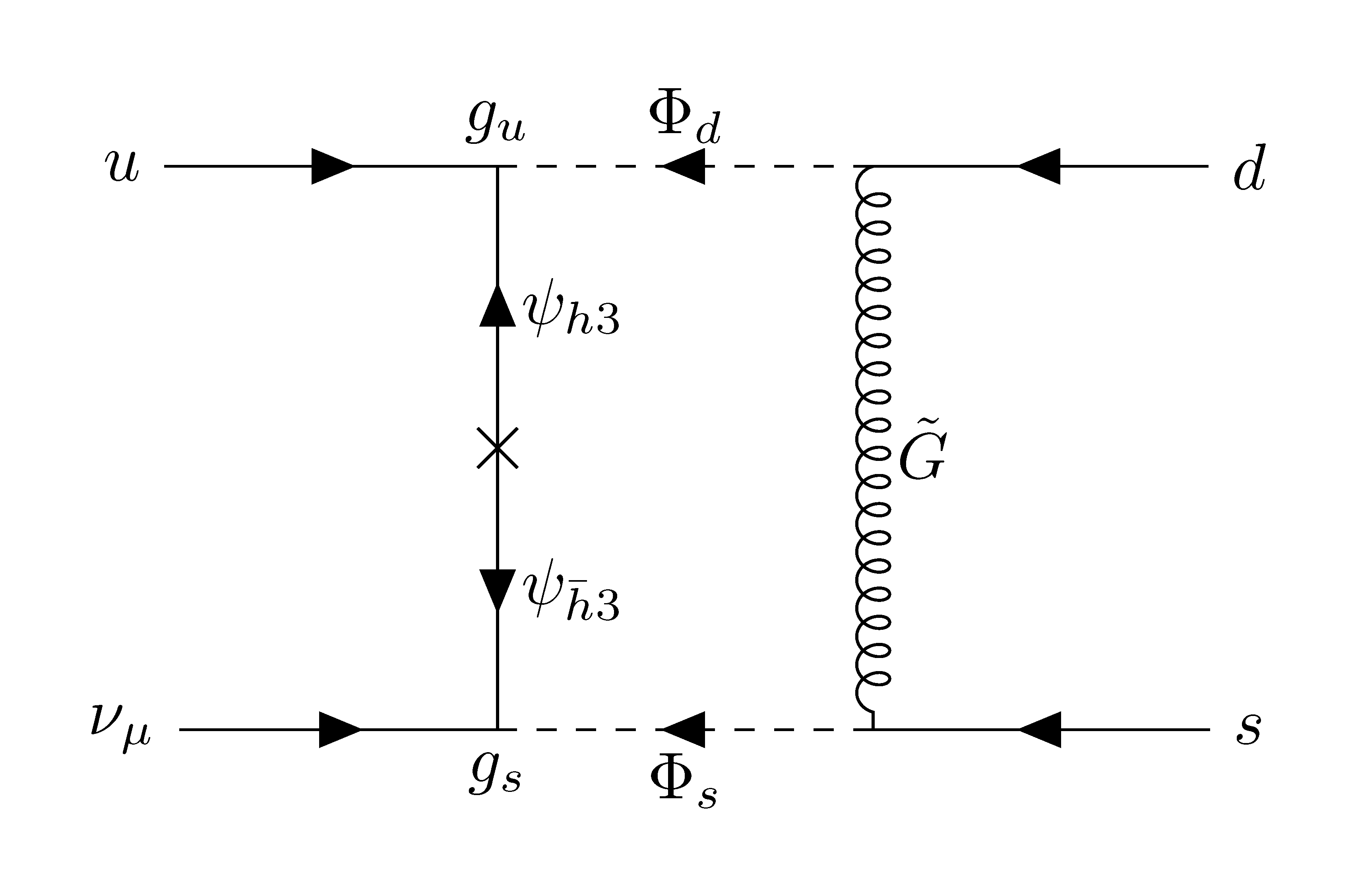
SUSY dimension-5 operator for proton decay (see text).

In SU(5) proton decay is generated by dimension-6 operators through the interaction of three quarks and a lepton that exchange an X boson with mass $M_X \sim \Lambda_{GUT}$. They are suppressed by factors $\textstyle M_X^{-4}$. All of these operators violate both baryon number (B) and lepton number (L) conservation but not the combination B − L.

=== Dimension-4 proton decay operators ===
In minimal supersymmetric standard models (MSSM), dimension-4 operators are possible, where two quarks from the proton annihilate into a virtual squark, which then decays into a lepton and another quark, typically resulting in a final state like p → e^{+}π^{0}. They are suppressed by a factor $\textstyle 1/{\Lambda^4_{MSSM}}$; since $\textstyle {\Lambda_{MSSM}}$ is of the order of 1 TeV (13 orders of magnitude smaller than $\textstyle {\Lambda_{GUT}}$) the proton lifetimes results to be far too short. To forbid these operators, a new symmetry has to be imposed: the R-parity. This symmetry also stabilizes the lightest supersymmetric particle as a dark matter candidate.

=== Dimension-5 proton decay operators ===
Also dimension-5 operators are possible in supersymmetric models, even after the introduction of R-parity, for instance where a heavy color-triplet Higgs exchange (represented by the internal Higgsino lines $\textstyle \Psi_{h3}$) is "dressed" by a loop containing a gluino ($\textstyle \Chi_\widetilde{G}$) and squarks ($\textstyle \Phi_d, \Phi_s$). This mechanism allows for the decay of a proton into a kaon and a muon neutrino $\textstyle p \rightarrow \overline{\nu}_\mu K^+$. These operators are suppressed by a factor $\textstyle 1/{\Lambda^2_{MSSM}}\Lambda^2_{GUT}$, so a tuning of MSSM is necessary to predict proton lifetimes longer than 10^{34} yr.
