= Tau (particle) =

Elementary subatomic particle with negative electric charge

- Composition: Elementary particle
- Statistics: Fermionic
- Family: Lepton
- Generation: Third
- Interactions: Gravity, electromagnetic, weak
- Symbol: τ^{−}
- Antiparticle: Antitau (τ^{+})
- Discovered: Martin Lewis Perl et al. (1975)
- Mass: 3.16754(21)×10^{−27} kg 1776.86(12) MeV/c^{2}
- Mean lifetime: 2.903(5)×10^{−13} s
- Electric charge: −1 e
- Color charge: None
- Spin: 1/2 ħ
- Weak isospin: LH: −1/2, RH: 0
- Weak hypercharge: LH: −1, RH: −2

The tau (τ, /ˈtaʊ, ˈtɔː, ˈtɒ/), also called the tau lepton, tau particle or tauon, is an elementary particle similar to the electron, with negative electric charge and a spin of 1/2. Like the electron, the muon, and the three neutrinos, the tau is a lepton, and like all elementary particles with half-integer spin, the tau has a corresponding antiparticle of opposite charge but equal mass and spin. In the tau's case, this is the "antitau" (also called the positive tau). Tau particles are denoted by the symbol τ^{−} and the antitaus by τ^{+}.

Tau leptons have a lifetime of 2.9×10^{−13} s and a mass of 1776.9 MeV/c^{2} (compared to 105.66 MeV/c^{2} for muons and 0.511 MeV/c^{2} for electrons). Because their interactions are very similar to those of the electron, a tau can be thought of as a much heavier version of the electron. Due to their greater mass, tau particles do not emit as much bremsstrahlung (braking radiation) as electrons; consequently they are potentially much more highly penetrating than electrons.

Because of its short lifetime, the range of the tau is mainly set by its decay length, which is too small for bremsstrahlung to be noticeable. Its penetrating power appears only at ultra-high velocity and energy (above petaelectronvolt energies), when time dilation extends its otherwise very short path-length.

As with the case of the other charged leptons, the tau has an associated tau neutrino, denoted by ν_{τ}.

== History ==
The search for tau started in 1960 at CERN by the Bologna–CERN–Frascati (BCF) group led by Antonino Zichichi. Zichichi came up with the idea of a new sequential heavy lepton, now called tau, and invented a method of search. He performed the experiment at the ADONE facility in 1969 once its accelerator became operational; however, the accelerator he used did not have enough energy to search for the tau particle.

The tau was independently anticipated in a 1971 article by Yung-su Tsai. Providing the theory for this discovery, the tau was detected in a series of experiments between 1974 and 1977 by Martin Lewis Perl with his and Tsai's colleagues at the Stanford Linear Accelerator Center (SLAC) and Lawrence Berkeley National Laboratory (LBL) group. Their equipment consisted of SLAC's then-new electron–positron colliding ring, called SPEAR, and the LBL magnetic detector. They could detect and distinguish between leptons, hadrons, and photons. They did not detect the tau directly, but rather discovered anomalous events:

"We have discovered 64 events of the form

e^{+} + e^{−} → e^{±} + μ^{∓} + at least two undetected particles

for which we have no conventional explanation."

The need for at least two undetected particles was shown by the inability to conserve energy and momentum with only one. However, no other muons, electrons, photons, or hadrons were detected. It was proposed that this event was the production and subsequent decay of a new particle pair:

e^{+} + e^{−} → τ^{+} + τ^{−} → e^{±} + μ^{∓} + 4ν

This was difficult to verify, because the energy to produce the τ^{+}τ^{−} pair is similar to the threshold for D meson production. The mass and spin of the tau were subsequently established by work done at DESY-Hamburg with the Double Arm Spectrometer (DASP), and at SLAC-Stanford with the SPEAR Direct Electron Counter (DELCO),

The symbol τ was derived from the Greek τρίτον (triton, meaning "third" in English), since it was the third charged lepton discovered.

Martin Lewis Perl shared the 1995 Nobel Prize in Physics with Frederick Reines. The latter was awarded his share of the prize for the experimental discovery of the electron neutrino.

== Tau decay ==
Feynman diagram of the decays of the tau by emission of an off-shell W boson

The tau is the only lepton with enough mass to decay into hadrons. Like the leptonic decay modes of the tau, the hadronic decay is through the weak interaction. (Note: Since the tauonic lepton number is conserved in weak decays, a tau neutrino is always created when a tau decays.)

The branching fractions of the dominant hadronic tau decays are:

- 25.49% for decay into a charged pion, a neutral pion, and a tau neutrino;
- 10.82% for decay into a charged pion and a tau neutrino;
- 9.26% for decay into a charged pion, two neutral pions, and a tau neutrino;
- 8.99% for decay into three charged pions (of which two have the same electrical charge) and a tau neutrino;
- 2.74% for decay into three charged pions (of which two have the same electrical charge), a neutral pion, and a tau neutrino;
- 1.04% for decay into three neutral pions, a charged pion, and a tau neutrino.

In total, the tau lepton will decay hadronically approximately 64.79% of the time.

The branching fractions of the common purely leptonic tau decays are:

- 17.82% for decay into a tau neutrino, electron and electron antineutrino;
- 17.39% for decay into a tau neutrino, muon, and muon antineutrino.

The similarity of values of the two branching fractions is a consequence of lepton universality.

== Exotic atoms ==
The tau lepton is predicted to form exotic atoms like other charged subatomic particles. The onium state consists of a tau and an anti-tau: τ^{+}τ^{−}, called tauonium or ditauonium.

Other possibilities for leptonic atoms involving tau include τ^{−}e^{+} and τ^{−}μ^{+} (as well as the corresponding antimatter pairings). All exotic atoms involving tau or anti-tau remain unobserved as of 2022. Its experimental detection would be an interesting test of quantum electrodynamics.

== See also ==
- Flavour (particle physics)
- Generation (particle physics)
- Koide formula
- Lepton
