= Muon neutrino =

Subatomic particle

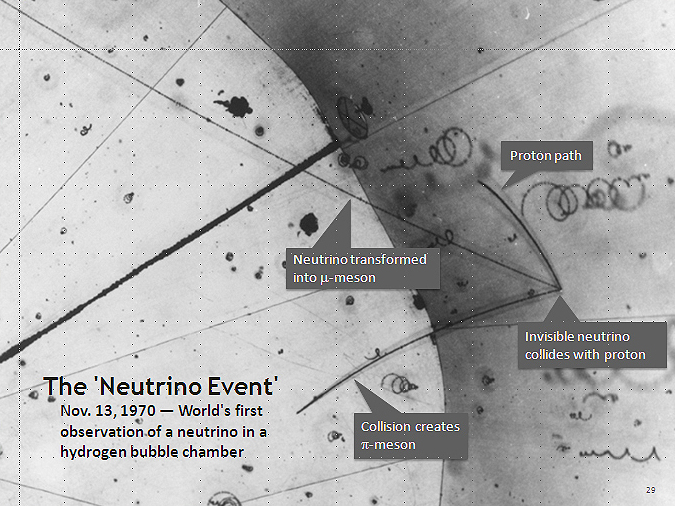
- The first observation of a neutrino in a hydrogen bubble chamber was made in 1970: a (non-visible) neutrino collided with a proton (which then moved along the short line, above the central track), producing a muon (at the origin of the long central rectilinear trace) and a pion (at the origin of the trace just below the muon).
- Composition: Elementary particle
- Statistics: Fermionic
- Family: Lepton
- Generation: Second
- Interactions: Weak, gravity
- Symbol: ν_{μ}
- Antiparticle: Muon antineutrino (ν̅_{μ})
- Theorized: (1940s)
- Discovered: Leon Lederman, Melvin Schwartz and Jack Steinberger (1962)
- Mass: Non-zero (theoretical) <0.19 MeV/c^{2}
- Electric charge: 0 e
- Color charge: No
- Spin: 1/2 ħ
- Weak isospin: 1/2
- Weak hypercharge: −1
- Chirality: left-handed (for right-handed neutrinos, see sterile neutrino)

The muon neutrino is an elementary particle which has the symbol ν_{μ} and zero electric charge. Together with the muon it forms the second generation of leptons, hence the name muon neutrino. It was discovered in 1962 by Leon Lederman, Melvin Schwartz and Jack Steinberger. The discovery was rewarded with the 1988 Nobel Prize in Physics.

== Discovery ==
Table of properties

The muon neutrino or "neutretto" was hypothesized by several physicists in the 1940s. The first paper on it may be Shoichi Sakata and Takesi Inoue's two-meson theory of 1942, which also involved two neutrinos. In 1962 Leon M. Lederman, Melvin Schwartz and Jack Steinberger proved the existence of the muon neutrino in an experiment at the Brookhaven National Laboratory. This earned them the 1988 Nobel Prize.

== Apparent speed anomaly ==
In September 2011 OPERA researchers reported that muon neutrinos were apparently traveling at faster than the speed of light. This result was confirmed in a second experiment in November 2011. These results were viewed skeptically by the scientific community at large, and more experiments investigated the anomaly. In March 2012 the ICARUS team published results directly contradicting the results of OPERA.

Later, in July 2012, the apparent anomalous super-luminous propagation of neutrinos was traced to a faulty element of the fibre optic timing system in Gran Sasso. After it was corrected the neutrinos appeared to travel with the speed of light within the errors of the experiment.

== See also ==
- Electron neutrino
- Neutrino oscillation
- PMNS matrix
- Tau neutrino
