= Baryon number =

Quantum number relating the quantity of quarks and antiquarks in a system

In particle physics, the baryon number (B) is an additive quantum number of a system. It is defined as
$$B = \frac{1}{3}(n_\text{q} - n_{\rm \overline q}),$$
where $n_{\rm q}$ is the number of quarks, and $n_{\rm \overline q}$ is the number of antiquarks. Baryons (three quarks) have B = +1, mesons (one quark, one antiquark) have B = 0, and antibaryons (three antiquarks) have B = −1. Exotic hadrons like pentaquarks (four quarks, one antiquark) and tetraquarks (two quarks, two antiquarks) are also classified as baryons and mesons depending on their baryon number. In the Standard Model B conservation is an accidental symmetry which means that it appears in the Standard Model but is often violated when going beyond it. Physics beyond the Standard Model theories that contain baryon number violation are, for example, Standard Model with extra dimensions, Supersymmetry, Grand Unified Theory and String theory.

== Baryon number vs. quark number ==
Quarks carry not only electric charge, but also charges such as color charge and weak isospin. Because of a phenomenon known as color confinement, a hadron cannot have a net color charge; that is, the total color charge of a particle has to be zero ("white"). A quark can have one of three "colors", dubbed "red", "green", and "blue"; while an antiquark may be either "anti-red", "anti-green" or "anti-blue".

For normal hadrons, a white color can thus be achieved in one of three ways:

- A quark of one color with an antiquark of the corresponding anticolor, giving a meson with baryon number 0,
- Three quarks of different colors, giving a baryon with baryon number +1,
- Three antiquarks of different anticolors, giving an antibaryon with baryon number −1.

The baryon number was defined long before the quark model was established, so rather than changing the definitions, particle physicists simply gave quarks one third the baryon number.

In theory, exotic hadrons can be formed by adding pairs of quarks and antiquarks, provided that each pair has a matching color/anticolor. For example, a pentaquark (four quarks, one antiquark) could have the individual quark colors: red, green, blue, blue, and antiblue. In 2015, the LHCb collaboration at CERN reported results consistent with pentaquark states in the decay of bottom Lambda baryons (Λ^{0}_{b}).

== Particles not formed of quarks ==
Particles without any quarks have a baryon number of zero. Such particles are

- leptons – the electron, muon, tauon, and their corresponding neutrinos
- vector bosons – the photon, W and Z bosons, gluons
- scalar boson – the Higgs boson
- second-order tensor boson – the hypothetical graviton

== Conservation ==
The law of conservation of baryon number was proposed in 1938 by Ernst Stueckelberg. Baryon number is a 'conserved' quantity in the sense that for perturbutative reactions in the Standard Model the total baryon number of the incoming particles is equal to the baryon number of the outgoing particles. Baryon number violation has never been observed experimentally. However, neither Baryon number nor lepton number can from theory be shown to be conserved quantities due to nonperturbative effects in the Standard Model. These effects are, for example, sphalerons and instantons. The hypothesized Adler–Bell–Jackiw anomaly in electroweak interactions is an example of an electroweak sphaleron. These reactions are massively suppressed at low energies/temperatures. At high temperatures, in for example the early universe, they could explain electroweak baryogenesis and leptogenesis. Sphalerons can only change the baryon and lepton number by 3 or multiples of 3 (the reactions create 3 leptons and 3 baryons or the corresponding antiparticles). This is because the sum of baryon and lepton number (see B − L) is a conserved quantity in the standard model.

The hypothetical concepts of Grand Unified Theory (GUT) models and supersymmetry allows for the changing of a baryon into leptons and antiquarks (see B − L), thus violating the conservation of both baryon and lepton numbers. Proton decay would be an example of such a process taking place, but has never been observed. Neutrinoless double beta decay is a reaction that would violate lepton number and neutron-to-antineutron oscillation would violate baryon number by −2 units.

The conservation of baryon number is not consistent with the physics of black hole evaporation via Hawking radiation. It is expected in general that quantum gravitational effects violate the conservation of all charges associated to global symmetries. The violation of conservation of baryon number led John Archibald Wheeler to speculate on a principle of mutability for all physical properties.

Searches for baryon number violation have been conducted in the following ways:

- Kamiokande in 1985
- ILL experiment in 1994
- Super-Kamiokande in 1999

Two planned experiments are:

- Hyper-Kamiokande
- HIBEAM/NNBAR

== See also ==
- Lepton number
- Flavour (particle physics)
- Isospin
- Hypercharge
- Proton decay
- B − L
- Neutrinoless double beta decay
