= Branching fraction =

Fraction of total particles in a sample which decay by a given mode

In particle physics and nuclear physics, the branching fraction (or branching ratio) for a decay is the fraction of particles which decay by an individual decay mode or with respect to the total number of particles which decay. It applies to either the radioactive decay of atoms or the decay of elementary particles. It is equal to the ratio of the partial decay constant of the decay mode to the overall decay constant. Sometimes a partial half-life is given, but this term is misleading; due to competing modes, it is not true that half of the particles will decay through a particular decay mode after its partial half-life. The partial half-life is merely an alternate way to specify the partial decay constant λ, the two being related through:

$$t_{1/2} = \frac{\ln 2}{\lambda}.$$

For example, for decays of ^{132}Cs, 98.13% are ε (electron capture) or β^{+} (positron) decays, and 1.87% are β^{−} (electron) decays. The half-life of this isotope is 6.480 days, which corresponds to a total decay constant of 0.1070 d^{−1}. Then the partial decay constants, as computed from the branching fractions, are 0.1050 d^{−1} for ε/β^{+} decays, and 2.001×10^{−3} d^{−1} for β^{−} decays. Their respective partial half-lives are 6.603 d and 347 d.

Isotopes with significant branching of decay modes include copper-64, arsenic-74, rhodium-102, indium-112, iodine-126 and holmium-164.

== Branching fractions of atomic states ==
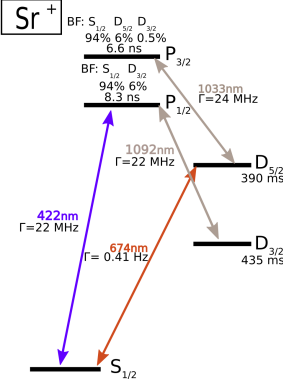
Branching fractions from the P3/2 and P1/2 states in ^{88}Sr+

In the field of atomic, molecular, and optical physics, a branching fraction refers to the probability of decay to a specific lower-lying energy states from some excited state. Suppose we drive a transition in an atomic system to an excited state |e⟩, which can decay into either the ground state |g⟩ or a long-lived state |d⟩. If the probability to decay (the branching fraction) into the |g⟩ state is $p$, then the probability to decay into the other state |d⟩ would be $1-p$. Further possible decays would split appropriately, with their probabilities summing to 1.

In some instances, instead of a branching fraction, a branching ratio is used. In this case, the branching ratio is just the ratio of the branching fractions between two states. To use our example from before, if the branching fraction to state |g⟩ is $p$, then the branching ratio comparing the transition rates to |g⟩ and |d⟩ would be $\frac{p}{1-p}$.

Branching fractions can be measured in a variety of ways, including time-resolved recording of the atom's fluorescence during a series of population transfers in the relevant states.
