= Lepton number =

Difference between number of leptons and antileptons

In particle physics, lepton number (historically also called lepton charge) is a conserved quantum number representing the difference between the number of leptons and the number of antileptons in an elementary particle reaction. Lepton number is an additive quantum number, so its sum is preserved in interactions (as opposed to multiplicative quantum numbers such as parity, where the product is preserved instead). The lepton number $L$ is defined by
$$L = n_\ell - n_{\overline\ell},$$
where

- $n_\ell \quad$ is the number of leptons and
- $n_{\overline\ell } \quad$ is the number of antileptons.

Lepton number was introduced in 1953 to explain the absence of reactions such as

ν̅ + n → p + e^{−}

in the Cowan–Reines neutrino experiment, which instead observed

ν̅ + p → n + e^{+} .

This process, inverse beta decay, conserves lepton number, as the incoming antineutrino has lepton number −1, while the outgoing positron (antielectron) also has lepton number −1.

== Lepton flavor conservation ==
In addition to lepton number, lepton family numbers are defined as

$L_\mathrm{e}$ the electron number, for the electron and the electron neutrino;
$L_\mathrm{\mu}$ the muon number, for the muon and the muon neutrino; and
$L_\mathrm{\tau}$ the tau number, for the tauon and the tau neutrino.

Prominent examples of lepton flavor conservation are the muon decays

μ^{−} → e^{−} + ν̅_{e} + ν_{μ}

and

μ^{+} → e^{+} + ν_{e} + ν̅_{μ} .

In these decay reactions, the creation of an electron is accompanied by the creation of an electron antineutrino, and the creation of a positron is accompanied by the creation of an electron neutrino. Likewise, a decaying negative muon results in the creation of a muon neutrino, while a decaying positive muon results in the creation of a muon antineutrino.

Finally, the weak decay of a lepton into a lower-mass lepton always results in the production of a neutrino-antineutrino pair:

τ^{−} → μ^{−} + ν̅_{μ} + ν_{τ} .

One neutrino carries through the lepton number of the decaying heavy lepton, (a tauon in this example, whose faint residue is a tau neutrino) and an antineutrino that cancels the lepton number of the newly created, lighter lepton that replaced the original. (In this example, a muon antineutrino with $L_\mathrm{\mu} = -1$ that cancels the muon's $L_\mathrm{\mu} = +1$.

== Violations of the lepton number conservation laws ==
Lepton flavor is only approximately conserved, and is notably not conserved in neutrino oscillation. However, the total lepton number is still conserved in the Standard Model.

Numerous searches for physics beyond the Standard Model incorporate searches for lepton number or lepton flavor violation, such as the hypothetical decay

μ^{−} → e^{−} + γ .

Experiments such as MEGA and SINDRUM have searched for lepton number violation in muon decays to electrons; MEG set the current branching limit of order 10^{−13} and plans to lower the limit to 10^{−14} after 2016. Some theories beyond the Standard Model, such as supersymmetry, predict branching ratios of order 10^{−12} to 10^{−14}. The Mu2e experiment, in construction as of 2017, has a planned sensitivity of order 10^{−17}.

Because the lepton number conservation law in fact is violated by chiral anomalies, there are problems applying this symmetry universally over all energy scales. However, the quantum number B − L is commonly conserved in Grand Unified Theory models.

If neutrinos turn out to be Majorana fermions, neither individual lepton numbers, nor the total lepton number
$$L \equiv L_\mathrm{e} + L_\mathrm{\mu} + L_\mathrm{\tau},$$
nor

B − L

would be conserved, e.g. in neutrinoless double beta decay, where two neutrinos colliding head-on might actually annihilate, similar to the (never observed) collision of a neutrino and antineutrino.

== Reversed signs convention ==
Some authors prefer to use lepton numbers that match the signs of the charges of the leptons involved, following the convention in use for the sign of weak isospin and the sign of strangeness quantum number (for quarks), both of which conventionally have the otherwise arbitrary sign of the quantum number match the sign of the particles' electric charges.

When following the electric-charge-sign convention, the lepton number (shown with an over-bar here, to reduce confusion) of an electron, muon, tauon, and any neutrino counts as $\bar{L} = -1;$ the lepton number of the positron, antimuon, antitauon, and any antineutrino counts as $\bar{L} = +1.$ When this reversed-sign convention is observed, the baryon number is left unchanged, but the difference B − L is replaced with a sum: B + L̅ , whose number value remains unchanged, since

L̅ = −L,

and

B + L̅ = B − L.

== See also ==
- Baryon number
