= Weak isospin =

Quantum number related to the weak interaction

In particle physics, weak isospin is a quantum number relating to the electrically charged part of the weak interaction. Particles with nonzero weak isospin can interact with the W^{±} bosons, while particles with zero weak isospin do not. Weak isospin is a concept parallel to the idea of isospin under the strong interaction. Weak isospin is usually given the symbol T or I, with the third component written as T_{3} or I_{3} . T_{3} is more important than T; typically "weak isospin" is used as short form of the proper term "3rd component of weak isospin". It can be understood as the eigenvalue of a charge operator.

== Notation ==
This article uses T and T_{3} for weak isospin and its projection. Regarding ambiguous notation, I is also used to represent the 'normal' (strong force) isospin, same for its third component I_{3} a.k.a. T_{3} or T_{z} . Aggravating the confusion, T is also used as the symbol for the Topness quantum number.

== Conservation law ==
The weak isospin conservation law relates to the conservation of $\ T_3\ ;$ weak interactions conserve T_{3}. It is also conserved by the electromagnetic and strong interactions. However, interaction with the Higgs field does not conserve T_{3}, as directly seen in propagating fermions, which mix their chiralities by the mass terms that result from their Higgs couplings. Since the Higgs field vacuum expectation value is nonzero, particles interact with this field all the time, even in vacuum. Interaction with the Higgs field changes particles' weak isospin (and weak hypercharge). Only a specific combination of electric charge is conserved. The electric charge, $\ Q\ ,$ is related to weak isospin, $\ T_3\ ,$ and weak hypercharge, $\ Y_\mathrm{W}\ ,$ by

$$Q = T_3 +\tfrac{1}{2}Y_\mathrm{W} ~.$$

In 1961 Sheldon Glashow proposed this relation by analogy to the Gell-Mann–Nishijima formula for charge to isospin.

== Relation with chirality ==
Fermions with negative chirality (also called "left-handed" fermions) have $\ T = \tfrac{1}{2}\$ and can be grouped into doublets with $T_3 = \plusmn \tfrac{1}{2}$ that behave the same way under the weak interaction. By convention, electrically charged fermions are assigned $T_3$ with the same sign as their electric charge. For example, up-type quarks (u, c, t) have $\ T_3 = +\tfrac{1}{2}\$ and always transform into down-type quarks (d, s, b), which have $\ T_3 = -\tfrac{1}{2}\ ,$ and vice versa. On the other hand, a quark never decays weakly into a quark of the same $\ T_3 ~.$ Something similar happens with left-handed leptons, which exist as doublets containing a charged lepton (e^{−}, μ^{−}, τ^{−}) with $\ T_3 = -\tfrac{1}{2}\$ and a neutrino (ν_{e}, ν_{μ}, ν_{τ}) with $\ T_3 = +\tfrac{1}{2} ~.$ In all cases, the corresponding anti-fermion has reversed chirality ("right-handed" antifermion) and reversed sign $\ T_3 ~.$

Fermions with positive chirality ("right-handed" fermions) and anti-fermions with negative chirality ("left-handed" anti-fermions) have $\ T = T_3 = 0\$ and form singlets that do not undergo charged weak interactions. Particles with $\ T_3 = 0\$ do not interact with W^{±} bosons; however, they do all interact with the Z^{0} boson.

=== Neutrinos ===
Lacking any distinguishing electric charge, neutrinos and antineutrinos are assigned the $\ T_3\$ opposite their corresponding charged lepton; hence, all left-handed neutrinos are paired with negatively charged left-handed leptons with $\ T_3 = -\tfrac{1}{2}\ ,$ so those neutrinos have $\ T_3 = +\tfrac{1}{2} ~.$ Since right-handed antineutrinos are paired with positively charged right-handed anti-leptons with $\ T_3 = +\tfrac{1}{2}\ ,$ those antineutrinos are assigned $\ T_3 = -\tfrac{1}{2} ~.$ The same result follows from particle-antiparticle charge & parity reversal, between left-handed neutrinos ($\ T_3 = +\tfrac{1}{2}\$) and right-handed antineutrinos ($\ T_3 = -\tfrac{1}{2}\$).

Left-handed fermions in the Standard Model
Generation 1				Generation 2				Generation 3			
Fermion	Electric charge	Symbol	Weak isospin	Fermion	Electric charge	Symbol	Weak isospin	Fermion	Electric charge	Symbol	Weak isospin
Electron	$\ -\!1~$	$\quad \mathrm{e}^-\$	$\ -\!\tfrac{1}{2}~$	Muon	$\ -\!1~$	$\quad \mathrm{\mu}^-\$	$\ -\!\tfrac{1}{2}~$	Tauon	$\ -\!1~$	$\quad \mathrm{\tau}^-~$	$\ -\!\tfrac{1}{2}~$
Up quark	$\ +\!\tfrac{2}{3}~$	$\ \mathrm{u}\$	$\ +\!\tfrac{1}{2}~$	Charm quark	$\ +\!\tfrac{2}{3}~$	$\ \mathrm{c}\$	$\ +\!\tfrac{1}{2}~$	Top quark	$\ +\!\tfrac{2}{3}~$	$\ \mathrm{t}\$	$\ +\!\tfrac{1}{2}~$
Down quark	$\ -\!\tfrac{1}{3}~$	$\ \mathrm{d}\$	$\ -\!\tfrac{1}{2}~$	Strange quark	$\ -\!\tfrac{1}{3}~$	$\ \mathrm{s}\$	$\ -\!\tfrac{1}{2}~$	Bottom quark	$\ -\!\tfrac{1}{3}~$	$\ \mathrm{b}\$	$\ -\!\tfrac{1}{2}~$
Electron neutrino	$\ \quad 0~$	$\ ~\nu_\mathrm{e}\$	$\ +\!\tfrac{1}{2}~$	Muon neutrino	$\ \quad 0~$	$\ ~\nu_\mathrm{\mu}\$	$\ +\!\tfrac{1}{2}~$	Tau neutrino	$\ \quad 0~$	$\ ~\nu_\mathrm{\tau}\$	$\ +\!\tfrac{1}{2}~$
All of the above left-handed (regular) particles have corresponding right-handed anti-particles with equal and opposite weak isospin.
All right-handed (regular) particles and left-handed anti-particles have weak isospin of 0.

== Weak isospin and the W bosons ==
The symmetry associated with weak isospin is SU(2) and requires gauge bosons with $\, T = 1 \,$ ( W^{+} , W^{−} , and W^{0} ) to mediate transformations between fermions with half-integer weak isospin charges.$\ T = 1\$ implies that W bosons have three different values of $\ T_3 \ :$

- W^{+} boson $(\,T_3 = +1\,)$ is emitted in transitions $\left(\,T_3 = +\tfrac{1}{2}\,\right)$ → $\left(\,T_3 = -\tfrac{1}{2}\,\right)~.$
- W^{0} boson $(\, T_3 =\, 0 \,)$ would be emitted in weak interactions where $\, T_3 \,$ does not change, such as neutrino scattering.
- W^{−} boson $(\, T_3 = -1 \,)$ is emitted in transitions $\left(\, T_3 = -\tfrac{1}{2} \,\right)$ → $\left(\, T_3 = +\tfrac{1}{2} \,\right)$.

Under electroweak unification, the W^{0} boson mixes with the weak hypercharge gauge boson B^{0} ; both have weak isospin = 0 . This results in the observed Z^{0} boson and the photon of quantum electrodynamics; the resulting Z^{0} and γ^{0} likewise have zero weak isospin.

== See also ==
- Weak hypercharge
- Weak charge
- Mathematical formulation of the Standard Model
