= Neutron–antineutron oscillations =

Hypothetical conversion between particles

Neutron-antineutron oscillations are a hypothetical process in which a neutron can spontaneously convert into an antineutron and vice versa. This process would violate baryon-number (B) conservation by two units ($\textstyle \Delta B=2$). No experimental evidence for neutron–antineutron oscillations has been found to date.

The possibility of baryon-number violation was identified by Andrei Sakharov in 1967 as one of the conditions required to explain the matter–antimatter asymmetry of the Universe. In 1970, Vadim Kuzmin proposed neutron–antineutron oscillations as a concrete realization of such violation. The conceptual foundation dates back to Ettore Majorana's 1937 hypothesis that neutrons could be identical to their own antiparticles. The theoretical framework was later developed by Sheldon Glashow in 1979, and formalized by Rabindra Mohapatra and Robert Marshak in 1980. These developments motivated experimental searches with both free neutrons and neutrons bound in nuclei.

Neutron–antineutron oscillations complement proton decay as a probe of baryon-number violation. While proton decay would violate baryon number by one unit, neutron–antineutron oscillations would violate it by two. The two processes explore very different mass scales (see Theoretical motivation). Baryon number conservation is predicted by the Standard Model of particle physics, although it is an accidental global symmetry, not associated with any fundamental gauge symmetry. Grand Unified Theories, which aim to unify the electromagnetic, weak and strong interactions into a single framework, naturally predict such violations.

== Phenomenology ==
Neutron–antineutron ($\textstyle n-\bar{n}$) oscillations can be described using a $\textstyle 2 \times 2$ Hamiltonian governing the time evolution of a neutron–antineutron system:

(1)
$$i \hbar \frac{\partial}{\partial t} \begin{pmatrix} n \\ \bar{n} \end{pmatrix} = \begin{pmatrix} E_n & \delta m \\ \delta m & E_{\bar{n}} \end{pmatrix} \begin{pmatrix} n \\ \bar{n} \end{pmatrix}$$.

Here, $\textstyle \delta m$ denotes the $\textstyle n-\bar{n}$ mixing parameter, induced by the underlying baryon number violating processes, while $\textstyle E_n$ and $\textstyle E_\bar{n}$ are the energies of the neutron and antineutron, respectively, which may be affected by external fields.

From equation (1), the probability of observing an antineutron at time t, given an initial neutron state at t=0, is:

(2) $P_\bar{n}(t) = \frac{4 \delta m^2}{\Delta E^2 + 4 \delta m^2} \sin^2\left(\sqrt{\Delta E^2 + 4 \delta m^2}\right)t;$

where $\textstyle \Delta E = E_n - E_\bar{n}$. Neutron decay, which would introduce a factor $\textstyle e^{- t/\tau_n}$ (with $\tau_n \simeq 880$ s), is neglected, as the relevant evolution times are much shorter than the neutron lifetime $\tau_n$.

Two limiting cases can be considered:

$\textstyle n-\bar{n}$ oscillations of free neutrons

Even for free neutrons, the amplitude of the $\textstyle P_\bar{n}(t)$ evolution is strongly suppressed. For oscillation times $\textstyle \tau_{n\bar n}$ of order 10^{8} s, corresponding to the range probed experimentally, the mixing parameter $\textstyle \delta m$ (with $\textstyle \delta m = 1/\tau_{n\bar{n}}$ in natural units) is of order 10^{-29} MeV.

Neutron and antineutrons have opposite magnetic moments ($\textstyle \mu_n \simeq 9.7 \cdot 10^{-27}$J/T), and in presence of the Earth's magnetic field ($\textstyle B \simeq 50$ μT), the energy splitting is $\textstyle \Delta E = 2 \mu_n B \simeq 3 \cdot 10^{-20}$MeV, leading to a suppression factor of order 10^{9}.

A practical regime is the quasi-free limit , $\textstyle \vert \Delta E \vert t \ll 1$, in which the Taylor expansion of the oscillatory term in equation (2) compensates for the suppression arising from the denominator. In this limit, it results

(3) $P_\bar{n}(t) \simeq [(\delta m)t]^2 = \left(\frac{t}{\tau_{n\bar{n}}}\right)^2$.

The quasi-free limit can be interpreted in terms of the energy–time uncertainty principle applied to the transition.

$\textstyle n-\bar{n}$ oscillations in matter

Inside nuclei, neutron and antineutron potentials differ by approximately 100 MeV, which suppresses the oscillation probability by roughly 31 orders of magnitude. Despite this suppression, experimental searches remain feasible, necessitating a rigorous treatment of the underlying equation (2).

The total energies can be defined as $\textstyle E_n=m_n + V_n$ and $\textstyle E_\bar{n}=m_n + V_\bar{n}$. While the neutron nuclear potential $\textstyle V_n$ is predominantly real, the antineutron potential $\textstyle V_\bar{n}$ incorporates a substantial imaginary component to account for antineutron annihilation processes: $V_\bar{n}=V_{\bar{n}R}-i V_\bar{{n}I}$ where the real part satisfies $V_{\bar{n}R} \simeq V_n$ and the imaginary part scales as $V_\bar{{n}I} \sim O(100)$ MeV.

Diagonalization of the mass mixing matrix yields the following energy eigenvalues:

(4) $E_{1,2}=1/2 \left[ E_n + E_\bar{n} \pm \sqrt{(E_n-E_\bar{n})^2+4 (\delta m)^2}\right]$.

A perturbative expansion of the E_{1} state, which consists predominantly of the neutron component, leads to:

(5) $E_1 \simeq m_n + V_n -i \frac{(\delta m)^2 V_{\bar{n}I}}{\left(V_{nR} - V_{\bar{n}R} \right)^2 + V^2_{\bar{n}I}}$

The imaginary part of E_{1} describes matter instability via antineutron annihilation, characterized by the decay rate:

(6) $\Gamma_m = \frac{1}{T_{n\bar{n}}} = \frac{2 (\delta m)^2 V_{\bar{n}I}}{ \left(V_{nR} - V_{\bar{n}R} \right)^2 + V^2_{\bar{n}I}}\,$

where the subscript m denotes "matter". Consequently, the characteristic lifetime scales as $\textstyle T_{n\bar{n}} = 1/\Gamma_m \propto (\delta m)^{-2}$, that can be expressed as

(7) $T_{n\bar{n}} = R \, \tau^2_{n\bar{n}}$.

Equation (7) relates the characteristic nuclear lifetime $T_{n\bar{n}}$, representing the time scale for an antineutron to be produced and subsequently annihilate within the nucleus, to the free neutron-antineutron oscillation time $\textstyle \tau_{n\bar n}$. The conversion factor R, which has dimensions of s^{-1}, is a nucleus-dependent quantity that cannot be derived from first principles; instead, it must be evaluated using suitable nuclear models.

The overall theoretical uncertainty for these one-nucleon processes is approximately 10%–15%. This precision represents a significant reduction compared to the 50%–100% uncertainty margins characteristic of early calculations from the 1980s and 1990s. While these improvements cover single-nucleon mechanisms, an additional 15%–30% systematic uncertainty related to two-nucleon processes within the nuclear medium should be must be accounted for. The primary driver behind this reduction in systematic error is the integration of extensive and precise data from antiprotonic atoms, which became available after the earlier calculations were published.

Furthermore, several studies in the literature have raised questions regarding whether free neutron oscillations and oscillations in matter are mediated by the same underlying effective operators.

== Experimental searches ==
$\textstyle n-\bar{n}$ oscillations with free neutron beams

In an experiment with free neutron beams, the oscillation time $\textstyle \tau_{n\bar{n}}$ can be expressed as:

(8) $\tau_{n\bar{n}} = \sqrt{\frac{I \, T \, \epsilon }{\bar{N}}}\,t$;

where $\textstyle \bar{N}$ is the number of detected antineutrons, $\textstyle I$ the neutron intensity, T the running time, $\textstyle \epsilon$ the antineutron detection efficiency and t the neutron propagation time under quasi-free conditions. Based on Poisson statistics, an experiment detecting no antineutron events sets $\textstyle \bar{N}=2.3$ at the 90% confidence level for limits on $\textstyle \tau_{n\bar{n}}$. The most intense sources for cold neutrons are research nuclear reactors and spallation neutron sources (see also neutron sources).

In the early 1980s several experiments were proposed at neutron facilities such as Oak Ridge National Laboratory, the Omega West Reactor in Los Alamos, the Los Alamos Meson Physics Facility,, the Moscow Meson Factory, the Triga Mark II reactor at Pavia University and the nuclear reactor at the Institute Laue-Langevin (ILL) in Grenoble (see also the reviews in). Only the last two experiments were ultimately carried out.

The ILL experiment reported the first experimental limit on $\textstyle \tau_{n\bar{n}}$ with free neutrons in 1985, $\textstyle \tau_{n\bar{n}} \geq 10^6$ s at 90% confidence level, while the NADIR collaboration in Pavia reported $\textstyle \tau_{n\bar{n}} \geq 0.5 \cdot 10^6$s in 1990.

Subsequently, groups from both collaborations joined to propose a new experiment at ILL ($\textstyle N\bar{N}$) with a projected sensitivity of $\textstyle \tau_{n\bar{n}} \geq 10^8$.

The experimental layout is detailed in the figure below.

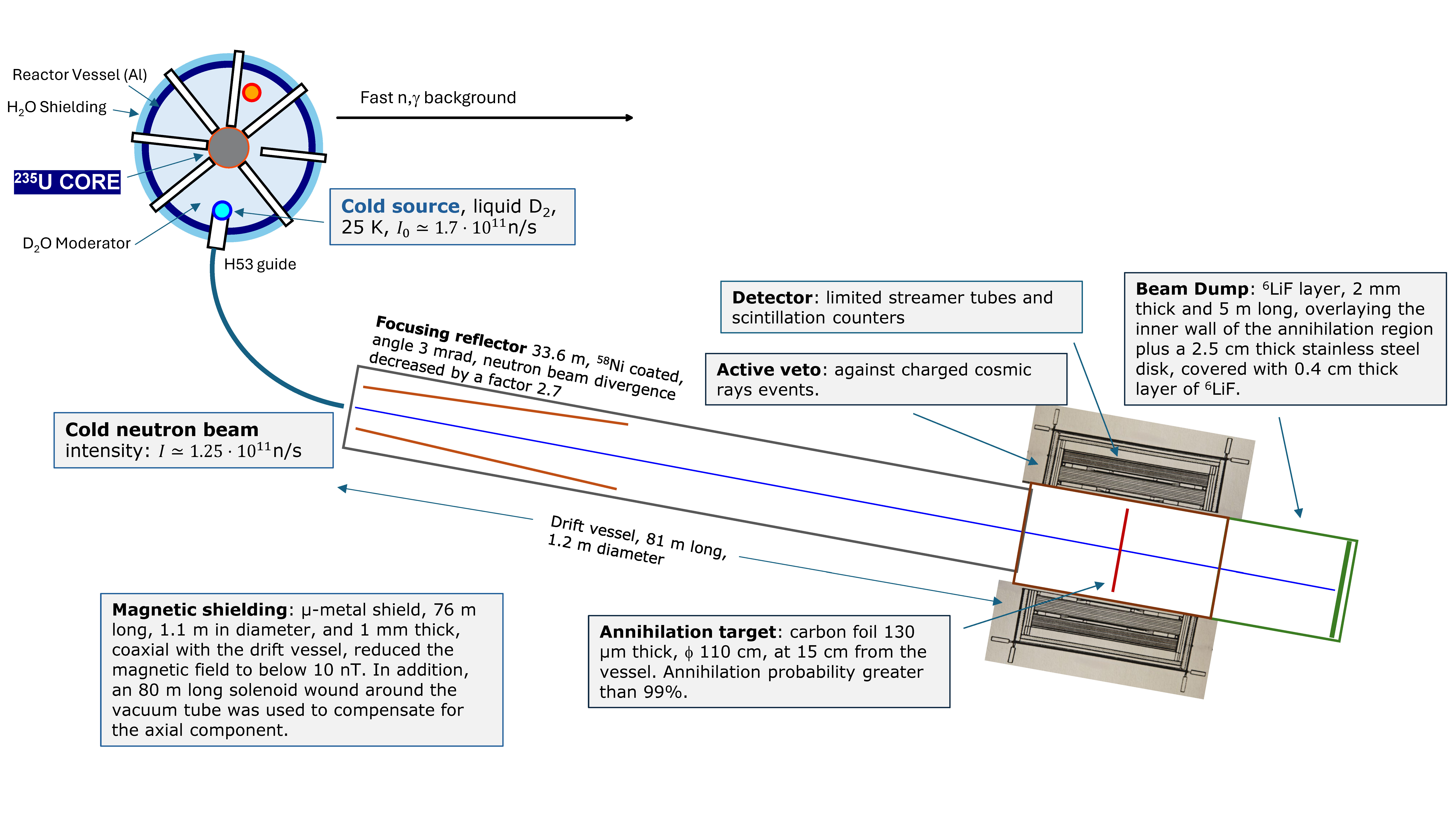
Layout of the $\textstyle {N \bar N}$ neutron-antineutron experiment at the ILL reactor.

The experiment took data for a time $\textstyle T=2.4 \cdot 10^7$ s, less than the designed 1 year because of ILL reactor breakdown. With an antineutron detection efficiency $\textstyle \epsilon = 0.52$ and no candidate events, it established a lower limit $\textstyle \tau_{n\bar{n}} \geq 0.86 \cdot 10^8$ s with a 90% confidence level.

$\textstyle n-\bar{n}$ oscillations in matter

As noted in phenomenology, equation (7), experiments looking for neutron–antineutron oscillations in matter measure the intranuclear oscillation time $T_{n\bar{n}}$ and infer the free oscillation time $\textstyle \tau_{n\bar n}$ by applying a nuclear factor R. Searches for $\textstyle n -\bar{n}$ oscillations in matter are generally carried out by the same experiments used in proton decay searches (they are better described in proton decay). The difficulty of these searches arises from several factors: antineutron annihilation in nuclei leads to a wide variety of final states with different branching ratios, so there is no single distinctive experimental signature; in addition, the annihilation process typically yields four to five low-momentum pions that current detectors struggle to reconstruct efficiently; in addition, these pions may rescatter within the nucleus before detection, further degrading the signal.

Consequently, detection efficiencies for annihilation events are low, making it difficult to distinguish signal from atmospheric neutrino backgrounds. As a result, experimental lower limits on the $\textstyle {n - \bar n}$ lifetime $T_{n\bar{n}}$ are substantially weaker than proton lifetime limits.

The experimental limits published so far are reported in the table below. In each case, $T_{n\bar{n}}$ is the one published by the experiment, whereas $\textstyle \tau_{n\bar n}$ is evaluated by applying the most recent computation for the nuclear factor R (and can differ by factors 2-3 from the original published values). The earliest results were published in 1983 by the water Cherenkov Homestake experiment, and by the tracking calorimeter Nusex, installed in the Mont Blanc Tunnel, Italy.

The most stringent limit has been published by the Super-Kamiokande experiment in 2021. The experiment analyzed an exposure of 0.37 Mton-years, corresponding to approximately 16.5 years of data taking with a fiducial volume of 22.5 kton. The total signal efficiency was 4.1% (with a 33% systematic uncertainty), and the expected background was 9.3 events over the full data set (with a 28% systematic uncertainty). The experiment observed 11 candidate events establishing a limit $T_{n\bar{n}} \geq 3.6 \cdot 10^{32}$ yr at 90% confidence level, corresponding to $\textstyle \tau_{n\bar n} \geq 4.7 \cdot 10^8$ s.

Results of $\textstyle {n - \bar n}$ oscillation searches from bound neutrons.
Year	Nucleus	Experiment	$T_{n\overline{n}}$ (10^{32} yr)	R (10^{23}/s)	$\tau_{n\overline{n}}$ (10^{8} s)
1983	^{16}O	Homestake	0.014	0.52	0.07
1983	^{56}Fe	Nusex	0.6	1.4	1.0
1984	^{16}O	IMB	0.24	0.52	1.2
1986	^{16}O	KamiokaNDE	0.4	0.52	1.6
1986	^{56}Fe	KGF	0.3	1.4	0.5
1990	^{56}Fe	Frejus	0.6	1.4	1.2
2002	^{56}Fe	Soudan	0.7	1.4	1.3
2017	^{2}H	SNO	0.1	0.25	1.4
2021	^{16}O	Super-K	3.6	0.52	4.7

== Future initiatives ==
Proposals for experiments with free-neutron beams were published after the conclusion of the $\textstyle N\bar{N}$ experiment at facilities as the HFIR nuclear reactor at Oak Ridge National Laboratory, the WWR-M nuclear reactor at Saint Petersburg, or the polarised cold neutron beam at the Institute Laue-Langevin at Grenoble. Unfortunately, none of them has been realized.

The HIBEAM/NNBAR collaboration has proposed a two-stage experiment at the European Spallation Source (ESS). The first stage, HIBEAM, is designed as a pilot program during the early commissioning phase of the ESS and will search for $\textstyle {n - \bar n}$ transitions without using the facility's full planned beam power. Its sensitivity is not expected to surpass the current limit on $\textstyle \tau_{n\bar n}$. The second stage, NNBAR, would employ the full ESS beam power together with high-reflectivity supermirror reflectors, either ellipsoidal or differential, that could collect a larger fraction of the neutron flux and focus it onto the target. Although the final configuration remains under development, the projected sensitivity is $\textstyle \tau_{n\bar n} \gtrsim 2.6 \cdot 10^9$s.

Experiments searching for $\textstyle n-\bar{n}$ oscillations in matter have largely reached the limits of their potential for significant improvement, as low efficiencies and substantial background subtraction limit further sensitivity gains. The Deep Underground Neutrino Experiment (DUNE) experiment in the United States scheduled to begin data collection in 2031, utilizes liquid argon time projection chamber (LArTPC) technology. This approach is expected to improve the efficiency and purity of the collected sample due to its advanced tracking capabilities. DUNE's expected sensitivity is estimated at $\textstyle \tau_{n\bar n} \geq 5.5 \cdot 10^8$s after ten years of data taking in its full configuration. The successor of Super-Kamiokande, Hyper-Kamiokande, has not yet released a prediction for its sensitivity on $\textstyle \tau_{n\bar n}$; however, a baseline extrapolation based on ten years of exposure yields an estimated sensitivity of $\textstyle \tau_{n\bar n} \gtrsim 10^9$s.

== Theoretical motivation ==
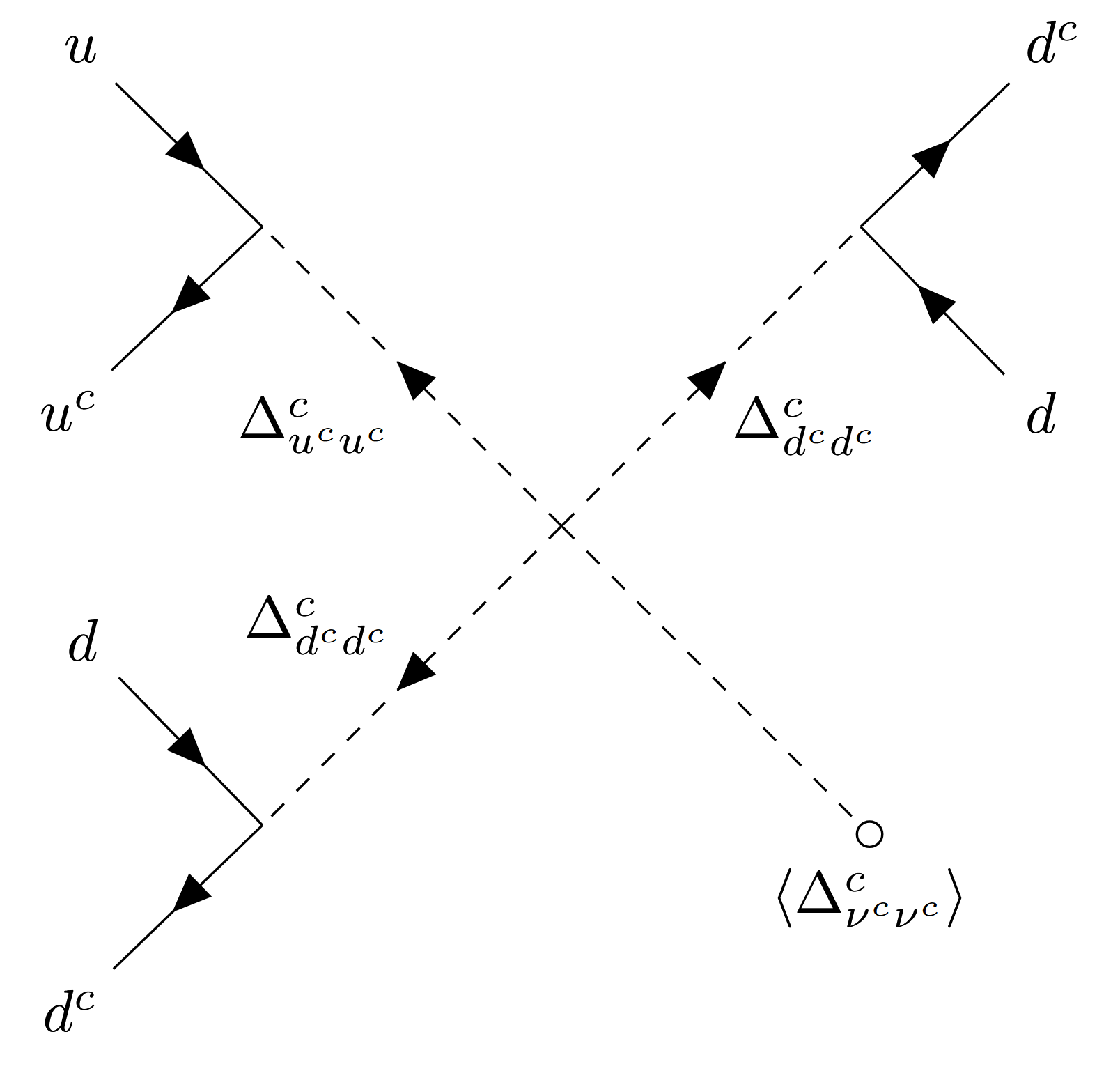
Feynman diagram for neutron-antineutron oscillation in SO(10)

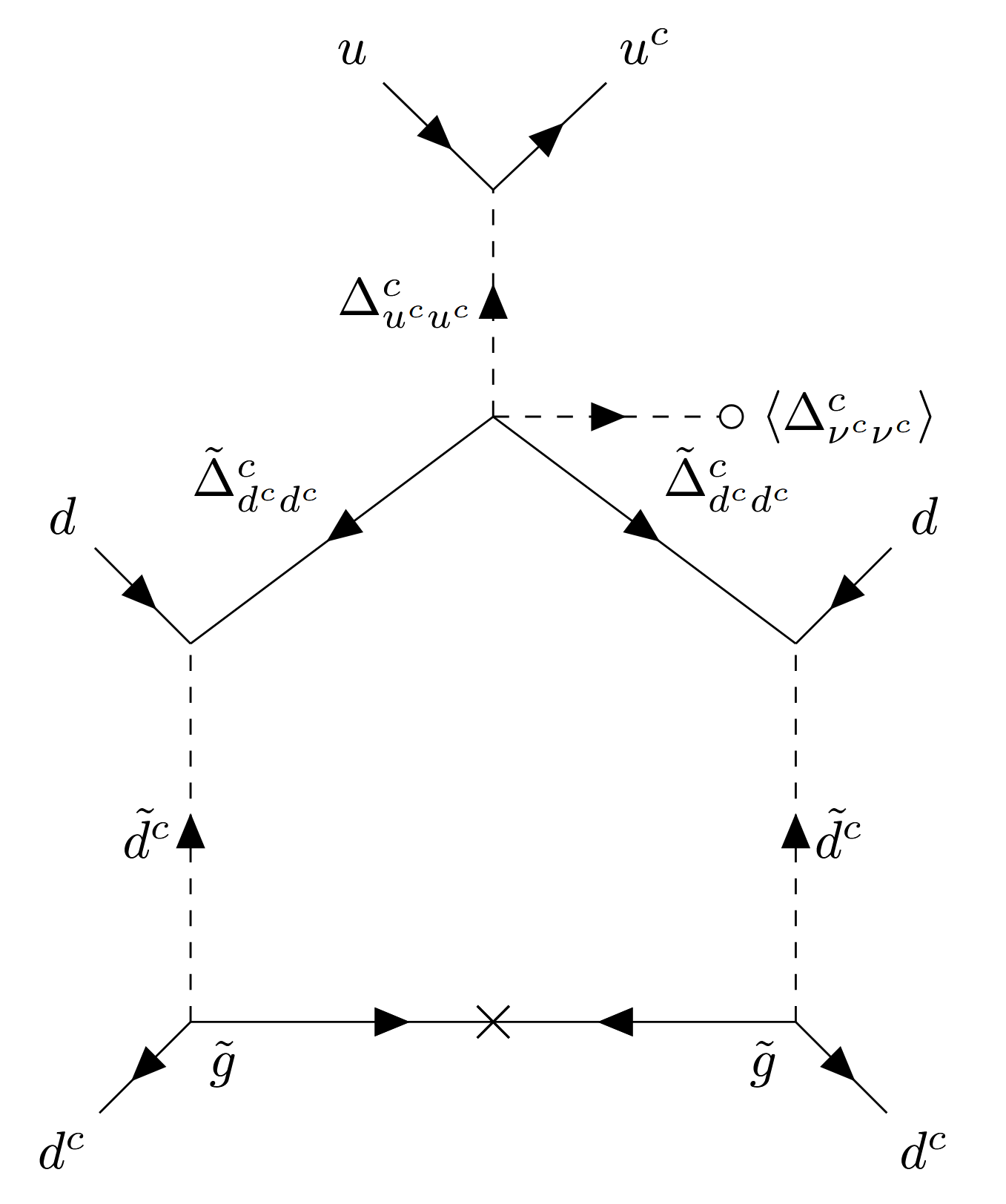
Feynman diagram for neutron-antineutron oscillation in supersymmetry

At the quark level, the $\textstyle n-\bar{n}$ transition converts three quarks into three antiquarks (udd → u^{c}d^{c}d^{c} ). This process violates baryon number conservation by 2 units ($\textstyle \Delta B=2$) while conserving lepton number ($\textstyle \Delta L=0$). It requires six-quark operators; the corresponding amplitude has mass dimension 9 and scales as $\lambda^{-5}_{B-L}$, where $\lambda_{B-L}$denotes the energy scale of (B−L) violation. The diquark scalars required to mediate this process are not present in the Standard Model but arise naturally in some grand unified theories (GUT). In contrast to proton decay, GUTs do not provide robust predictions for the neutron–antineutron oscillation time $\textstyle \tau_{n\bar{n}}$ (see, e.g., for a review).

The SU(5) group, introduced in 1974 by Georgi and Glashow, cannot accommodate $\textstyle \Delta B=2$ processes. In the minimal SU(5) model, the difference between baryon number (B) and lepton number (L), denoted as B−L, remains an exact global symmetry. Extensions of the model involving higher-dimensional Higgs multiplets can break this symmetry, allowing neutrinos to acquire Majorana masses while simultaneously providing the operators needed to mediate neutron oscillations.

SO(10) GUTs are a natural framework for $\textstyle {n-\bar{n}}$ oscillations because they allow B−L to be a gauged symmetry. Spontaneous breaking of this symmetry by two units (Δ(B−L)=2) creates a deep theoretical link between Majorana neutrino masses (via the seesaw mechanism) and $\textstyle n-\bar{n}$ transitions. While standard GUT scales are near 10^{16} GeV, a restricted class of SO(10) models can support intermediate scales ( $\lambda_{B-L} \sim 10^2-10^3$ TeV) where oscillations become experimentally observable. In SO(10) $\textstyle {n-\bar{n}}$ oscillations can be mediated by color-sextet scalar diquark fields, as illustrated in figure. Specifically, the post-sphaleron baryogenesis scenario within these models predicts an upper limit for the oscillation time of 5×10^{10} seconds.

Supersymmetry (SUSY) significantly modifies the operators mediating $\textstyle {n-\bar{n}}$ oscillations by introducing superpartners like squarks and gluinos. These additional states can alleviate the strong suppression present in the Standard Model by allowing lower-dimensional operators, for example, of dimension 4 or 5. As a consequence, the oscillation time scales as $\textstyle \tau_{n\bar{n}} \propto \lambda^2_{B-L} \lambda^3_{SM}$ rather than $\lambda^5_{B-L}$ (where $\lambda_{SM}$ denotes the Standard Model energy scale). This behavior can lead to detectable oscillation times (∼10^{10} s) even at very high scales of $\lambda_{B-L} \sim 10^8-10^{11}$ GeV. A representative Feynman diagram for such a transition is shown in Figure.

Models that propagate Standard Model fields into extra dimensions predict $\textstyle \tau_{n\bar{n}}$ of the order of 10^{9} s.
