= Trinification =

Grand Unified Theory in physics

In physics, the trinification model is a Grand Unified Theory proposed by Alvaro De Rújula, Howard Georgi and Sheldon Glashow in 1984.

== Details ==
It states that the gauge group is either

$$SU(3)_C\times SU(3)_L\times SU(3)_R$$

or

$$[SU(3)_C\times SU(3)_L\times SU(3)_R]/\mathbb{Z}_3$$;

and that the fermions form three families, each consisting of the representations: $\mathbf Q=(3,\bar{3},1)$, $\mathbf Q^c=(\bar{3},1,3)$, and $\mathbf L=(1,3,\bar{3})$. The L includes a hypothetical right-handed neutrino, which may account for observed neutrino masses (see neutrino oscillations), and a similar sterile "flavon."

There is also a $(1,3,\bar{3})$ and maybe also a $(1,\bar{3},3)$ scalar field called the Higgs field which acquires a vacuum expectation value. This results in a spontaneous symmetry breaking from

$SU(3)_L\times SU(3)_R$ to $[SU(2)\times U(1)]/\mathbb{Z}_2$.

The fermions branch (see restricted representation) as

$$(3,\bar{3},1)\rightarrow(3,2)_{\frac{1}{6}}\oplus(3,1)_{-\frac{1}{3}}$$,

$$(\bar{3},1,3)\rightarrow 2\,(\bar{3},1)_{\frac{1}{3}}\oplus(\bar{3},1)_{-\frac{2}{3}}$$,

$$(1,3,\bar{3})\rightarrow 2\,(1,2)_{-\frac{1}{2}}\oplus(1,2)_{\frac{1}{2}}\oplus2\,(1,1)_0\oplus(1,1)_1$$,

and the gauge bosons as

$$(8,1,1)\rightarrow(8,1)_0$$,

$$(1,8,1)\rightarrow(1,3)_0\oplus(1,2)_{\frac{1}{2}}\oplus(1,2)_{-\frac{1}{2}}\oplus(1,1)_0$$,

$$(1,1,8)\rightarrow 4\,(1,1)_0\oplus 2\,(1,1)_1\oplus 2\,(1,1)_{-1}$$.

Note that there are two Majorana neutrinos per generation (which is consistent with neutrino oscillations). Also, each generation has a pair of triplets $(3,1)_{-\frac{1}{3}}$ and $(\bar{3},1)_{\frac{1}{3}}$, and doublets $(1,2)_{\frac{1}{2}}$ and $(1,2)_{-\frac{1}{2}}$, which decouple at the GUT breaking scale due to the couplings

$$(1,3,\bar{3})_H(3,\bar{3},1)(\bar{3},1,3)$$

and

$$(1,3,\bar{3})_H(1,3,\bar{3})(1,3,\bar{3})$$.

Note that calling representations things like $(3,\bar{3},1)$ and (8,1,1) is purely a physicist's convention, not a mathematician's, where representations are either labelled by Young tableaux or Dynkin diagrams with numbers on their vertices, but it is standard among GUT theorists.

Since the homotopy group

$$\pi_2\left(\frac{SU(3)\times SU(3)}{[SU(2)\times U(1)]/\mathbb{Z}_2}\right)=\mathbb{Z}$$,

this model predicts 't Hooft–Polyakov magnetic monopoles.

The trinification symmetry Lie algebra $\mathfrak{su}(3)_C \oplus \mathfrak{su}(3)_L \oplus \mathfrak{su}(3)_R$ is a maximal subalgebra of E_{6}, whose matter representation 27 has exactly the same representation and unifies the $(3,3,1)\oplus(\bar{3},\bar{3},1)\oplus(1,\bar{3},3)$ fields. E_{6} adds 54 gauge bosons, 30 it shares with SO(10), the other 24 to complete its $\mathbf{16}\oplus\mathbf{\overline{16}}$.
