= Peter Minkowski =

Swiss theoretical physicist

- Born: 10 May 1941 (age 85); Zürich
- Died: 24 October 2025; Bern
- Education: ETH Zurich
- Known for: Seesaw mechanism SO(10)
- Scientific career
- Fields: Theoretical physics
- Workplaces: University of Bern
- Doctoral advisor: Markus Fierz

Peter Minkowski (10 May 1941 - 24 October 2025) was a Swiss theoretical physicist. He is primarily known for his proposal, with Harald Fritzsch, of SO(10) as the group of a Grand Unified Theory and for his independent proposal, more-or-less simultaneously with a number of other theorists, of the seesaw mechanism for the generation of neutrino masses.

== Biography ==
Peter Minkowski, a life-long Swiss citizen, is the son of Mieczyslaw, a neurologist, and Irene Minkowski-Fux, a painter and architect. After his Abitur at Realgymnasium Zurich and his physics Diploma in 1963 from the Federal Institute of Technology in Zurich (ETHZ), he earned his Ph.D. in 1967 at ETHZ under Markus Fierz with thesis Versuch einer konsistenten Theorie eines Spin-2-Mesons ("Attempt at a Consistent Theory of a Spin 2 Meson").

In 1967–1969 Minkowski was an assistant at the Institute for Theoretical Physics, University of Louvain in Belgium, in 1969–1971 research associate of the Swiss Institute for Nuclear Research (SIN then in Zurich, now renamed PSI), in 1971–1973 fellow then research associate at the Theory Division of CERN in Geneva, Switzerland, and in 1973–1976 research associate then senior research fellow at the Institute for Theoretical Physics, Caltech. In April 1976 he accepted an invitation from Heinrich Leutwyler to become a member of the Institute for Theoretical Physics of the University of Bern, Switzerland, where he held the following positions: from 1976 to 1977 guest professor, from 1977 to 31 March 1989 professor extraordinarius of physics, and from 1 April 1989 until 2006 as professor ordinarius; he retired as professor emeritus on 31 August 2006.

Minkowski has pursued research along three main avenues: spontaneous phenomena in strong interactions and resonance structure, quark and gluon pairing; unification of gauge symmetries, extensions to include gravity, extensions to cosmology; and electroweak interactions and their interplay with the strong interactions. He has also worked on double beta decay; this work originated in a Diploma thesis by W. Brems at the University of Louvain in 1969. In the 1990s Minkowski, along with P. Grieder, worked on the DUMAND Project.

In May 1967 he married Elisabeth Schatz from Zurich; they have three children.
