= Flipped SO(10) =

Grand Unified Theory

In particle physics, flipped SO(10) is a Grand Unified Theory which is to standard SO(10) as flipped SU(5) is to SU(5).

== Details ==
In conventional SO(10) models, the fermions lie in three spinorial 16 representations, one for each generation, which decomposes under [SU(5) × U(1)_{χ}]/Z_{5} as

$$16 \rightarrow 10_1 \oplus \bar{5}_{-3} \oplus 1_5$$

This can either be the Georgi–Glashow SU(5) or flipped SU(5).

In flipped SO(10) models, however, the gauge group is not just SO(10) but SO(10)_{F} × U(1)_{B} or [SO(10)_{F} × U(1)_{B}]/Z_{4}. The fermion fields are now three copies of

$$16_1\oplus 10_{-2} \oplus 1_4$$

These contain the Standard Model fermions as well as additional vector fermions with GUT scale masses. If we suppose [SU(5) × U(1)_{A}]/Z_{5} is a subgroup of SO(10)_{F}, then we have the intermediate scale symmetry breaking [SO(10)_{F} × U(1)_{B}]/Z_{4} → [SU(5) × U(1)_{χ}]/Z_{5} where

$$\chi=-{A\over 4}+{5B\over 4}$$

In that case,

$$\begin{align}
16_1&\rightarrow 10_1 \oplus \bar{5}_2 \oplus 1_0 \\
10_{-2}&\rightarrow 5_{-2} \oplus \bar{5}_{-3} \\
1_4 &\rightarrow 1_5
\end{align}$$

note that the Standard Model fermion fields (including the right handed neutrinos) come from all three [SO(10)_{F} × U(1)_{B}]/Z_{4} representations. In particular, they happen to be the 10_{1} of 16_{1}, the $\bar{5}_{-3}$ of 10_{−2} and the 1_{5} of 1_{4} (apologies to the readers for mixing up SO(10) × U(1) notation with SU(5) × U(1) notation, but it would be really cumbersome if we have to spell out which group any given notation happens to refer to. It is left up to the reader to determine the group from the context. This is a standard practice in the GUT model building literature anyway).

The other remaining fermions are vectorlike. To see this, note that with a 16_{1H} and a $\overline{16}_{-1H}$ Higgs field, we can have VEVs which breaks the GUT group down to [SU(5) × U(1)_{χ}]/Z_{5}. The Yukawa coupling 16_{1H} 16_{1} 10_{−2} will pair up the 5_{−2} and $\bar{5}_2$ fermions. And we can always introduce a sterile neutrino φ which is invariant under [SO(10) × U(1)_{B}]/Z_{4} and add the Yukawa coupling

$$<\overline{16}_{-1H}>16_1 \phi$$

OR we can add the nonrenormalizable term

$$<\overline{16}_{-1H}><\overline{16}_{-1H}>16_1 16_1$$

Either way, the 1_{0} component of the fermion 16_{1} gets taken care of so that it is no longer chiral.

It has been left unspecified so far whether [SU(5) × U(1)_{χ}]/Z_{5} is the Georgi–Glashow SU(5) or the flipped SU(5). This is because both alternatives lead to reasonable GUT models.

One reason for studying flipped SO(10) is because it can be derived from an E_{6} GUT model.
