= Howard Georgi =

American theoretical physicist (born 1947)

- Born: Howard Mason Georgi III; 6 January 1947 (age 79); San Bernardino, California, U.S.
- Education: Harvard University (AB); Yale University (PhD)
- Known for: Georgi–Glashow model; Georgi–Jarlskog mass relation; De Rujula–Georgi–Glashow quark model; Composite Higgs models; Dimensional deconstruction; Heavy quark effective theory; Little Higgs; SO(10); Soft SUSY breaking; Unparticle physics; Trinification
- Awards: Sakurai Prize (1995); Dirac Medal (2000); Pomeranchuk Prize (2006)
- Scientific career
- Fields: Theoretical physics
- Institutions: Harvard University
- Doctoral advisor: Charles M. Sommerfield
- Doctoral students: Sally Dawson; Edward Farhi; Peter Galison; John Hagelin; Lawrence John Hall; David B. Kaplan; Dean Lee; Ann Nelson; Lisa Randall

Howard Mason Georgi III (born January 6, 1947) is an American theoretical physicist and the Mallinckrodt Professor of Physics and Harvard College Professor at Harvard University. He is also director of undergraduate studies in physics. He was co-master and then faculty dean of Leverett House with his wife, Ann Blake Georgi, from 1998 to 2018. His early work was in Grand Unification and gauge coupling unification within SU(5) and SO(10) groups (see Georgi–Glashow model).

== Education ==
Georgi graduated from Pingry School in 1964, graduated from Harvard College in 1967 and obtained his Ph.D. from Yale University in 1971. He was junior fellow in the Harvard Society of Fellows (1973–1976) and a senior fellow from (1982–1998).

== Career ==
In early 1974 Georgi (with Sheldon Glashow) published the first grand unified theory (GUT), the Minimal SU(5) Georgi–Glashow model. Georgi independently (alongside Harald Fritzsch and Peter Minkowski) published a minimal SO(10) GUT model in 1974.

Georgi proposed an SU(5) GUT model with softly broken supersymmetry with Savas Dimopoulos in 1981. This paper is one of the foundational works for the supersymmetric Standard Model (MSSM). After the measurements of the three Standard Model gauge couplings at LEP I in 1991, it was shown that particle content of the MSSM, in contrast to the Standard Model alone, led to precision gauge coupling unification.

He has since worked on several different areas of physics including composite Higgs models, heavy quark effective theory, dimensional deconstruction, little Higgs, and unparticle theories.

Unparticle physics is a theory that there exists matter that cannot be explained in terms of particles, because its components are scale invariant. Howard Georgi proposed this theory in the spring of 2007 in the papers "Unparticle Physics" and "Another Odd Thing About Unparticle Physics".

Together with Vadim Kuzmin, Georgi received the Pomeranchuk Prize of the Alikhanov Institute for Theoretical and Experimental Physics (ITEP) in 2006.

Georgi has published several books, one of which is Lie Algebras in Particle Physics published by World Scientific. He has also published The Physics of Waves and Weak Interactions and Modern Particle Theory.

== Honors ==
In 1995 he was elected to the National Academy of Sciences and received the Sakurai Prize; in 2000 he shared the Dirac Medal with Jogesh Pati and Helen Quinn.
