= W′ and Z′ bosons =

Hypothetical particles in physics

- Composition: Elementary particle
- Statistics: Bosonic
- Family: Gauge boson
- Interactions: Standard-Model Extension
- Status: Hypothetical
- Mass: unknown
- Decays into: similar to W and Z bosons
- Electric charge: W′: ±1 e Z′: 0 e
- Spin: 1
- Spin states: 2

In particle physics, W′ and Z′ bosons (or W-prime and Z-prime bosons) refer to hypothetical gauge bosons that arise from extensions of the electroweak symmetry of the Standard Model. They are named in analogy with the Standard Model W and Z bosons.

== Types ==
=== Types of W′ bosons ===
W′ bosons often arise in models with an extra SU(2) gauge group relative to the full Standard Model gauge group SU(3) × SU(2) × U(1). The extended SU(2) × SU(2) symmetry spontaneously breaks into the diagonal subgroup SU(2)_{W} which corresponds to the conventional SU(2) in electroweak theory.

More generally, there could be n copies of SU(2), which are then broken down to a diagonal SU(2)_{W}. This gives rise to n^{2} − 1 different W′^{+}, W′^{−}, and Z′ bosons. Such models might arise from a quiver diagram, for example.

In order for the W′ bosons to couple to weak isospin, the extra SU(2) and the Standard Model SU(2) must mix; one copy of SU(2) must break around the TeV scale (to get W′ bosons with a TeV mass) leaving a second SU(2) for the Standard Model. This happens in Little Higgs models that contain more than one copy of SU(2). Because the W′ comes from the breaking of an SU(2), it is generically accompanied by a Z′ boson of (almost) the same mass and with couplings related to the W′ couplings.

Another model with W′ bosons but without an additional SU(2) factor is the so-called 331 model with $\; \beta = \pm \tfrac{1}{\sqrt{3\;} } ~.$ The symmetry breaking chain SU(3)_{L} × U(1)_{W} → SU(2)_{W} × U(1)_{Y} leads to a pair of W′^{±} bosons and three Z′ bosons.

W′ bosons also arise in Kaluza–Klein theories with SU(2) in the bulk.

=== Types of Z′ bosons ===
Various models of physics beyond the Standard Model predict different kinds of Z′ bosons.

Models with a new U(1) gauge symmetry
The Z′ is the gauge boson of the (broken) U(1) symmetry.
E_{6} models
This type of model contains two Z′ bosons, which can mix in general.
Pati–Salam
In addition to a fourth leptonic "color", Pati–Salam includes a right handed weak interaction with W′ and Z′ bosons.
Topcolor and Top Seesaw Models of Dynamical Electroweak Symmetry Breaking
Both these models have Z′ bosons that select the formation of particular condensates.
Little Higgs models
These models typically include an enlarged gauge sector, which is broken down to the Standard Model gauge symmetry around the TeV scale. In addition to one or more Z′ bosons, these models often contain W′ bosons.
Kaluza–Klein models
The Z′ boson are the excited modes of a neutral bulk gauge symmetry.
Stueckelberg Extensions
The Z′ boson is sourced from couplings found in string theories with intersecting D-branes (see Stueckelberg action).

== Searches ==
=== Direct searches for "wide resonance-width" models ===
The following statements pertain only to "wide resonance width" models.

A W′-boson could be detected at hadron colliders through its decay to lepton plus neutrino or top quark plus bottom quark, after being produced in quark–antiquark annihilation. The LHC reach for W′ discovery is expected to be a few TeV.

Direct searches for Z′-bosons are carried out at hadron colliders, since these give access to the highest energies available. The search looks for high-mass dilepton resonances: the Z′-boson would be produced by quark–antiquark annihilation and decay to an electron–positron pair or a pair of opposite-charged muons. The most stringent current limits come from the Fermilab Tevatron, and depend on the couplings of the Z′-boson (which control the production cross section); as of 2006, the Tevatron excludes Z′-bosons up to masses of about 800 GeV for "typical" cross sections predicted in various models.

=== Direct searches for "narrow resonance-width" models ===
Recent classes of models have emerged that naturally provide cross section signatures that fall on the edge, or slightly below the 95% confidence level limits set by the Tevatron, and hence can produce detectable cross section signals for a Z′ boson in a mass range much closer to the Z pole-mass than the "wide width" models discussed above.

These "narrow width" models which fall into this category are those that predict a Stückelberg Z′ as well as a Z′ from a universal extra dimension (see "The Z′ hunters' guide". for links to these papers).

On 7 April 2011, the CDF collaboration at the Tevatron reported an excess in proton–antiproton collision events that produce a W boson accompanied by two hadronic jets. This could possibly be interpreted in terms of a Z′ boson.

On 2 June 2015, the ATLAS experiment at the LHC reported evidence for W′-bosons at significance 3.4 σ, still too low to claim a formal discovery. Researchers at the CMS experiment also independently reported signals that corroborate ATLAS's findings.

In March 2021, there were some reports to hint at the possible existence of Z′ bosons as an unexpected difference in how beauty quarks decay to create electrons or muons. The measurement has been made at a statistical significance of 3.1 σ, which is well below the 5 σ level that is conventionally considered sufficient proof of a discovery.

== Z′–Y mixings ==
There may be gauge kinetic mixings between the U(1)′ of the Z′ boson and U(1)_{Y} of hypercharge. This mixing leads to a tree level modification of the Peskin–Takeuchi parameters.

== See also ==
- X and Y bosons – Hypothetical elementary particles
- List of hypothetical particles
