= Dimitri Nanopoulos =

Greek physicist

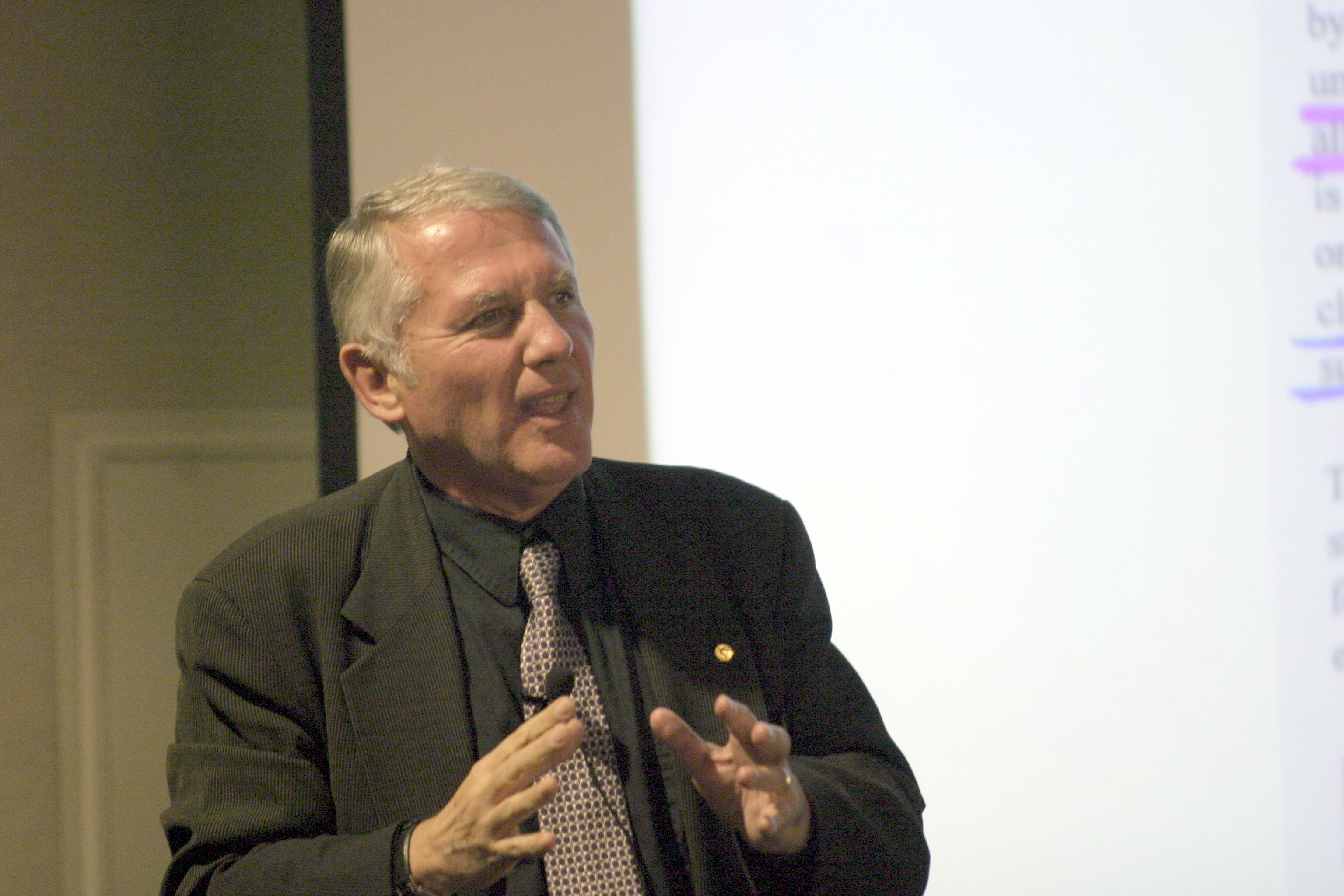
- Born: 13 September 1948 (age 77); Athens, Greece
- Education: University of Athens; University of Sussex
- Known for: Flipped SU(5); Coining the term "Grand Unified Theory"
- Awards: Onassis Prize (2006); Enrico Fermi Prize (2009)
- Scientific career
- Fields: High energy physics
- Workplaces: Texas A&M University; École Normale Supérieure; Harvard University; NASA; CERN; Academy of Athens; University of Athens
- Doctoral advisor: Norman Dombey

Dimitri V. Nanopoulos (/nəˈnɒpəlɒs/; Greek: Δημήτρης Νανόπουλος; born 13 September 1948) is a Greek physicist residing in New York. He is one of the most regularly cited researchers in the world, cited more than 57,000 times across a number of separate branches of science.

== Biography ==
Dimitri Nanopoulos was born and raised in Athens. His grandfather, Dimitris Nakas, was an Aromanian and an ardent Greek nationalist who had migrated at the beginning of the 20th century to New York, but in March 1914 moved back to his native land in order to participate in the Greek struggle for northern Epirus, and died in 1916; Nanopoulos' father was born nine months prior. His father's name was Vaios. His mother, Vasiliki Korasidi, was born in Kifissia but descended from the Greek island of Kea. Nanopoulos studied Physics at the University of Athens and he graduated in 1971, continuing his studies at the University of Sussex in England, where he obtained his Ph.D. in 1973 in High Energy Physics. He has been a Research Fellow at the European Organization for Nuclear Research (CERN) in Geneva, Switzerland and for many years has been a staff member and Research Fellow at the École Normale Supérieure, in Paris, France and at Harvard University, Cambridge, United States. In 1989, he was elected Professor at the Department of Physics, at the NASA-supported Texas A&M University, where since 1992 he has been a Distinguished Professor of Physics, and since 2002 holder of the Mitchell/Heep Chair in High Energy Physics; he is also a distinguished HARC fellow at the Houston Advanced Research Center in Houston, Texas. In 1997 he was appointed regular member of the Academy of Athens, and, in 2005, President of the Greek National Council for Research and Technology, Greek National Representative to the European Laboratory for Particle Physics, CERN, and to the European Space Agency (ESA).

He has made several contributions to particle physics and cosmology, and works in string unified theories, fundamentals of quantum theory, astroparticle physics and quantum-inspired models of brain function. He has written over 767 original papers, including 15 books. He has over 57,000 citations, placing him as the fourth most cited High Energy Physicist of all time, according to the 2001 and 2004 census. Since 1988 he has been fellow of the American Physical Society, and since 1992 member of the Italian Physical Society. In 1996, he was made Commander of the Order of Honour of the Greek State.

He is one of the principal developers of the flipped SU(5) model, first proposed by Stephen M. Barr in a paper published in 1982. It was further described in a 1984 paper by Nanopoulos, J. P. Deredinger, and J.E Kim and a 1987 paper by Nanopoulos, I. Antoniadis, John Ellis, and John Hagelin.

On 17 October 2006 he was awarded the Onassis International prize by the Alexander S. Onassis Foundation. On 28 September 2009, he was awarded the 2009 Enrico Fermi Prize from the Italian Physical Society in recognition of his pioneering work in the field of string theory.

== See also ==
- Quantum Aspects of Life
