= Grand Unified Theory =

Comprehensive physical model

A Grand Unified Theory (GUT) is any model in particle physics that merges the electromagnetic, weak, and strong forces (the three gauge interactions of the Standard Model) into a single force at high energies. Although this unified force has not been directly observed, many GUT models theorize its existence. If the unification of these three interactions is possible, it raises the possibility that there was a grand unification epoch in the very early universe in which these three fundamental interactions were not yet distinct.

Experiments have confirmed that at high energy, the electromagnetic interaction and weak interaction unify into a single combined electroweak interaction. GUT models predict that at even higher energy, the strong and electroweak interactions will unify into one electronuclear interaction. Unifying gravity with the electronuclear interaction would provide a more comprehensive theory of everything (TOE) rather than a Grand Unified Theory. Thus, GUTs are often seen as an intermediate step towards a TOE.

The theorized electronuclear interaction is characterized by one larger gauge symmetry group and thus several force carrier particles and running coupling constants that converge at high enough energies. The novel particles predicted by GUT models are expected to have extremely high masses—around the GUT scale of 10^{16} GeV/c^{2} (only three orders of magnitude below the Planck scale of 10^{19} GeV/c^{2})—and so are well beyond the reach of any foreseen particle hadron collider experiments. Therefore, the particles predicted by GUT models will be unable to be observed directly, and instead the effects of grand unification might be detected through indirect observations of the following:

- proton decay,
- neutron-antineutron oscillations,
- electric dipole moments of elementary particles,
- or the properties of neutrinos.

Some GUTs, such as the Pati–Salam model, predict the existence of magnetic monopoles.

While GUTs might be expected to offer simplicity over the complications present in the Standard Model, realistic models remain complicated because they need to introduce additional fields and interactions, or even additional dimensions of space, in order to reproduce observed fermion masses and mixing angles. This difficulty, in turn, may be related to the existence of family symmetries beyond the conventional GUT models. Due to this and the lack of any observed effect of grand unification so far, there is no generally accepted GUT model.

Models that do not unify the three interactions using one simple group as the gauge symmetry but do so using semisimple groups can exhibit similar properties and are sometimes referred to as Grand Unified Theories as well.

Unsolved problem in physics
Are the three forces of the Standard Model unified at high energies? By which symmetry is this unification governed? Can the Grand Unification Theory explain the number of fermion generations and their masses?
More unsolved problems in physics

== History ==
Historically, the first true GUT, which was based on the simple Lie group SU(5), was proposed by Howard Georgi and Sheldon Glashow in 1974. The Georgi–Glashow model was preceded by the semisimple Lie algebra Pati–Salam model by Abdus Salam and Jogesh Pati also in 1974, who pioneered the idea to unify gauge interactions.

The acronym GUT was first coined in 1978 by CERN researchers John Ellis, Andrzej Buras, Mary K. Gaillard, and Dimitri Nanopoulos, however in the final version of their paper they opted for the less anatomical GUM (Grand Unification Mass). Nanopoulos later that year was the first to use the acronym in a paper.

== Motivation ==
The fact that the electric charges of electrons and protons cancel each other exactly to extreme precision is essential for the existence of the macroscopic world as we know it, but this important property of elementary particles is not explained in the Standard Model of particle physics. While the description of strong and weak interactions within the Standard Model is based on gauge symmetries governed by the simple symmetry groups SU(3) and SU(2) which allow only discrete charges, the remaining component, the weak hypercharge interaction is described by an abelian symmetry U(1) which in principle allows for arbitrary charge assignments. (Note: There are however certain constraints on the choice of particle charges from theoretical consistency, in particular anomaly cancellation.) The observed charge quantization, namely the postulation that all known elementary particles carry electric charges which are exact multiples of one-third of the "elementary" charge, has led to the idea that hypercharge interactions and possibly the strong and weak interactions might be embedded in one Grand Unified interaction described by a single, larger simple symmetry group containing the Standard Model. This would automatically predict the quantized nature and values of all elementary particle charges. Since this also results in a prediction for the relative strengths of the fundamental interactions which we observe, in particular, the weak mixing angle, grand unification ideally reduces the number of independent input parameters but is also constrained by observations.

Grand unification is reminiscent of the unification of electric and magnetic forces by Maxwell's field theory of electromagnetism in the 19th century, but its physical implications and mathematical structure are qualitatively different.

== Unification of matter particles ==
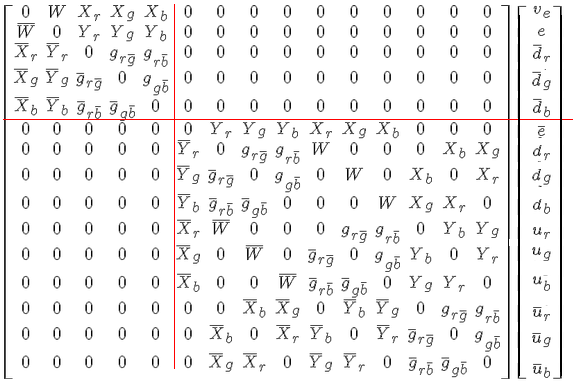
Schematic representation of fermions and bosons in SU(5) GUT showing 5 + 10 split in the multiplets. Neutral bosons (photon, Z-boson, and neutral gluons) are not shown but occupy the diagonal entries of the matrix in complex superpositions.

=== SU(5) ===
The pattern of weak isospins, weak hypercharges, and strong charges for particles in the SU(5) model, rotated by the predicted weak mixing angle, showing electric charge roughly along the vertical. In addition to Standard Model particles, the theory includes twelve colored X bosons, responsible for proton decay.

SU(5) is the simplest GUT. The smallest simple Lie group which contains the Standard Model, and upon which the first Grand Unified Theory was based, is

SU(5) ⊃ SU(3) × SU(2) × U(1).

Such group symmetries allow the reinterpretation of several known particles, including the photon, W and Z bosons, and gluon, as different states of a single particle field. However, it is not obvious that the simplest possible choices for the extended "Grand Unified" symmetry should yield the correct inventory of elementary particles. The fact that all currently known matter particles fit perfectly into three copies of the smallest group representations of SU(5) and immediately carry the correct observed charges, is one of the first and most important reasons why people believe that a Grand Unified Theory might actually be realized in nature.

The two smallest irreducible representations of SU(5) are 5 (the defining representation) and 10. (These bold numbers indicate the dimension of the representation.) In the standard assignment, the 5 contains the charge conjugates of the right-handed down-type quark color triplet and a left-handed lepton isospin doublet, while the 10 contains the six up-type quark components, the left-handed down-type quark color triplet, and the right-handed electron. This scheme has to be replicated for each of the three known generations of matter. It is notable that the theory is anomaly free with this matter content.

The hypothetical right-handed neutrinos are a singlet of SU(5), which means its mass is not forbidden by any symmetry; it doesn't need a spontaneous electroweak symmetry breaking which explains why its mass would be heavy (see seesaw mechanism).

=== SO(10) ===
The pattern of weak isospin, W, weaker isospin, W′, strong g3 and g8, and baryon minus lepton, B, charges for particles in the SO(10) Grand Unified Theory, rotated to show the embedding in E_{6}.

The next simple Lie group which contains the Standard Model is

$$\rm SO(10)\supset SU(5)\supset SU(3)\times SU(2)\times U(1) .$$

Here, the unification of matter is even more complete, since the irreducible spinor representation 16 contains both the 5̅ and 10 of SU(5) and a right-handed neutrino, and thus the complete particle content of one generation of the extended Standard Model with neutrino masses. This is already the largest simple group that achieves the unification of matter in a scheme involving only the already known matter particles (apart from the Higgs sector).

Since different Standard Model fermions are grouped together in larger representations, GUTs specifically predict relations among the fermion masses, such as between the electron and the down quark, the muon and the strange quark, and the tau lepton and the bottom quark for SU(5) and SO(10). Some of these mass relations hold approximately, but most don't (see Georgi-Jarlskog mass relation).

The boson matrix for SO(10) is found by taking the 15 × 15 matrix from the 10 + 5 representation of SU(5) and adding an extra row and column for the right-handed neutrino. The bosons are found by adding a partner to each of the 20 charged bosons (2 right-handed W bosons, 6 massive charged gluons and 12 X/Y type bosons) and adding an extra heavy neutral Z-boson to make 5 neutral bosons in total. The boson matrix will have a boson or its new partner in each row and column. These pairs combine to create the familiar 16D Dirac spinor matrices of SO(10).

=== E_{6} ===
In some forms of string theory, including E_{8} × E_{8} heterotic string theory, the resultant four-dimensional theory after spontaneous compactification on a six-dimensional Calabi–Yau manifold resembles a GUT based on the group E_{6}. Notably E_{6} is the only exceptional simple Lie group to have any complex representations, a requirement for a theory to contain chiral fermions (namely all weakly-interacting fermions). Hence the other four (G_{2}, F_{4}, E_{7}, and E_{8}) can't be the gauge group of a GUT.

=== Extended Grand Unified Theories ===
Non-chiral extensions of the Standard Model with vectorlike split-multiplet particle spectra which naturally appear in the higher SU(N) GUTs considerably modify the desert physics and lead to the realistic (string-scale) grand unification for conventional three quark-lepton families even without using supersymmetry (see below). On the other hand, due to a new missing VEV mechanism emerging in the supersymmetric SU(8) GUT the simultaneous solution to the gauge hierarchy (doublet-triplet splitting) problem and problem of unification of flavor can be argued.

GUTs with four families / generations, SU(8): Assuming 4 generations of fermions instead of 3 makes a total of 64 types of particles. These can be put into 64 = 8 + 56 representations of SU(8). This can be divided into SU(5) × SU(3)_{F} × U(1) which is the SU(5) theory together with some heavy bosons which act on the generation number.

GUTs with four families / generations, O(16): Again assuming 4 generations of fermions, the 128 particles and anti-particles can be put into a single spinor representation of O(16).

=== Symplectic groups and quaternion representations ===
Symplectic gauge groups could also be considered. For example, Sp(8) (which is called Sp(4) in the article symplectic group) has a representation in terms of 4 × 4 quaternion unitary matrices which has a 16 dimensional real representation and so might be considered as a candidate for a gauge group. Sp(8) has 32 charged bosons and 4 neutral bosons. Its subgroups include SU(4) so can at least contain the gluons and photon of SU(3) × U(1). Although it's probably not possible to have weak bosons acting on chiral fermions in this representation. A quaternion representation of the fermions might be:

$$\begin{bmatrix}
e   + i\ \overline{e}            + j\ v             + k\ \overline{v} \\
u_r + i\ \overline{u}_\mathrm{\overline r} + j\ d_\mathrm{r} + k\ \overline{d}_\mathrm{\overline r} \\
u_g + i\ \overline{u}_\mathrm{\overline g} + j\ d_\mathrm{g} + k\ \overline{d}_\mathrm{\overline g} \\
u_b + i\ \overline{u}_\mathrm{\overline b} + j\ d_\mathrm{b} + k\ \overline{d}_\mathrm{\overline b} \\
\end{bmatrix}_\mathrm{L}$$

A further complication with quaternion representations of fermions is that there are two types of multiplication: left multiplication and right multiplication which must be taken into account. It turns out that including left and right-handed 4 × 4 quaternion matrices is equivalent to including a single right-multiplication by a unit quaternion which adds an extra SU(2) and so has an extra neutral boson and two more charged bosons. Thus the group of left- and right-handed 4 × 4 quaternion matrices is Sp(8) × SU(2) which does include the Standard Model bosons:

$$\mathrm{ SU(4,\mathbb{H})_L\times \mathbb{H}_R = Sp(8)\times SU(2) \supset SU(4)\times SU(2) \supset SU(3)\times SU(2)\times U(1) }$$

If $\psi$ is a quaternion valued spinor, $A^{ab}_\mu$ is quaternion hermitian 4 × 4 matrix coming from Sp(8) and $B_\mu$ is a pure vector quaternion (both of which are 4-vector bosons) then the interaction term is:

$$\ \overline{\psi^{a}} \gamma_\mu\left( A^{ab}_\mu\psi^b + \psi^a B_\mu \right)\$$

=== Octonion representations ===
It can be noted that a generation of 16 fermions can be put into the form of an octonion with each element of the octonion being an 8-vector. If the 3 generations are then put in a 3x3 hermitian matrix with certain additions for the diagonal elements then these matrices form an exceptional (Grassmann) Jordan algebra, which has the symmetry group of one of the exceptional Lie groups (F_{4}, E_{6}, E_{7}, or E_{8}) depending on the details.

$$\psi=
\begin{bmatrix}
a & e & \mu \\
\overline{e} & b & \tau \\
\overline{\mu} & \overline{\tau} & c
\end{bmatrix}$$
$$\ [\psi_A,\psi_B] \subset \mathrm{J}_3(\mathbb{O})\$$

Because they are fermions the anti-commutators of the Jordan algebra become commutators. It is known that E_{6} has subgroup O(10) and so is big enough to include the Standard Model. An E_{8} gauge group, for example, would have 8 neutral bosons, 120 charged bosons and 120 charged anti-bosons. To account for the 248 fermions in the lowest multiplet of E_{8}, these would either have to include anti-particles (and so have baryogenesis), have new undiscovered particles, or have gravity-like (spin connection) bosons affecting elements of the particles spin direction. Each of these possesses theoretical problems.

=== Beyond Lie groups ===
Other structures have been suggested including Lie 3-algebras and Lie superalgebras. Neither of these fit with Yang–Mills theory. In particular Lie superalgebras would introduce bosons with incorrect statistics. Supersymmetry, however, does fit with Yang–Mills.

== Unification of forces and the role of supersymmetry ==
The unification of forces is possible due to the energy scale dependence of force coupling parameters in quantum field theory called renormalization group "running", which allows parameters with vastly different values at usual energies to converge to a single value at a much higher energy scale.

The renormalization group running of the three gauge couplings in the Standard Model has been found to nearly, but not quite, meet at the same point if the hypercharge is normalized so that it is consistent with SU(5) or SO(10) GUTs, which are precisely the GUT groups which lead to a simple fermion unification. This is a significant result, as other Lie groups lead to different normalizations. However, if the supersymmetric extension MSSM is used instead of the Standard Model, the match becomes much more accurate. In this case, the coupling constants of the strong and electroweak interactions meet at the grand unification energy, also known as the GUT scale:

$$\Lambda_{\text{GUT}} \approx 10^{16}\,\text{GeV} .$$

It is commonly believed that this matching is unlikely to be a coincidence, and is often quoted as one of the main motivations to further investigate supersymmetric theories despite the fact that no supersymmetric partner particles have been experimentally observed. Also, most model builders simply assume supersymmetry because it solves the hierarchy problem—i.e., it stabilizes the electroweak Higgs mass against radiative corrections.

== Neutrino masses ==
Since Majorana masses of the right-handed neutrino are forbidden by SO(10) symmetry, SO(10) GUTs predict the Majorana masses of right-handed neutrinos to be close to the GUT scale where the symmetry is spontaneously broken in those models. In supersymmetric GUTs, this scale tends to be larger than would be desirable to obtain realistic masses of the light, mostly left-handed neutrinos (see neutrino oscillation) via the seesaw mechanism. These predictions are independent of the Georgi–Jarlskog mass relations, wherein some GUTs predict other fermion mass ratios.

== Proposed theories ==
Several theories have been proposed, but none is currently universally accepted. An even more ambitious theory that includes all fundamental forces, including gravitation, is termed a theory of everything. Some common mainstream GUT models are:

- Pati–Salam model – SU(4) × SU(2) × SU(2)
- Georgi–Glashow model – SU(5); and Flipped SU(5) – SU(5) × U(1)
- SO(10) model; and Flipped SO(10) – SO(10) × U(1)
- E_{6} model; and Trinification – SU(3) × SU(3) × SU(3)
- minimal left-right model – SU(3)_{C} × SU(2)_{L} × SU(2)_{R} × U(1)_{B−L}
- 331 model – SU(3)_{C} × SU(3)_{L} × U(1)_{X}
- chiral color

Note: These models refer to Lie algebras not to Lie groups. The Lie group could be $[\mathrm{SU}(4) \times \mathrm{SU}(2) \times \mathrm{SU}(2)] / \Z_2,$ just to take a random example.

The most promising candidate is SO(10). (Minimal) SO(10) does not contain any exotic fermions (i.e. additional fermions besides the Standard Model fermions and the right-handed neutrino), and it unifies each generation into a single irreducible representation. A number of other GUT models are based upon subgroups of SO(10). They are the minimal left-right model, SU(5), flipped SU(5) and the Pati–Salam model. The GUT group E_{6} contains SO(10), but models based upon it are significantly more complicated. The primary reason for studying E_{6} models comes from E_{8} × E_{8} heterotic string theory.

GUT models generically predict the existence of topological defects such as monopoles, cosmic strings, domain walls, and others. But none have been observed. Their absence is known as the monopole problem in cosmology. Many GUT models also predict proton decay, although not the Pati–Salam model. As of now, proton decay has never been experimentally observed. The minimal experimental limit on the proton's lifetime pretty much rules out minimal SU(5) and heavily constrains the other models. The lack of detected supersymmetry to date also constrains many models.

Proton Decay. These graphics refer to the X boson and Higgs boson families.
Dimension 6 proton decay mediated by the X boson $\ (3,2)_{-\tfrac{5}{6}}\$ in SU(5) GUT

Dimension 6 proton decay mediated by the X boson $\ (3,2)_{\tfrac{1}{6}}\$ in flipped SU(5) GUT

Dimension 6 proton decay mediated by the triplet Higgs $\ T(3,1)_{-\tfrac{1}{3}}$ and the anti-triplet Higgs $\ \bar{T} (\bar{3},1)_{\tfrac{1}{3}}$ in SU(5) GUT

Some GUT theories like SU(5) and SO(10) suffer from what is called the doublet-triplet problem. These theories predict that for each electroweak Higgs doublet, there is a corresponding colored Higgs triplet field with a very small mass (many orders of magnitude smaller than the GUT scale here). In theory, unifying quarks with leptons, the Higgs doublet would also be unified with a Higgs triplet. Such triplets have not been observed. They would also cause extremely rapid proton decay (far below current experimental limits) and prevent the gauge coupling strengths from running together in the renormalization group.

Most GUT models require a threefold replication of the matter fields. As such, they do not explain why there are three generations of fermions. Most GUT models also fail to explain the little hierarchy between the fermion masses for different generations.

== Ingredients ==
A GUT model consists of a gauge group which is a compact Lie group, a connection form for that Lie group, a Yang–Mills action for that connection given by an invariant symmetric bilinear form over its Lie algebra (which is specified by a coupling constant for each factor), a Higgs sector consisting of a number of scalar fields taking on values within real/complex representations of the Lie group and chiral Weyl fermions taking on values within a complex rep of the Lie group. The Lie group contains the Standard Model group and the Higgs fields acquire VEVs leading to a spontaneous symmetry breaking to the Standard Model. The Weyl fermions represent matter.

== Current evidence ==
The discovery of neutrino oscillations indicates that the Standard Model is incomplete, but there is currently no clear evidence that nature is described by any Grand Unified Theory. Neutrino oscillations have led to renewed interest toward certain GUT such as SO(10).

Some of the few possible experimental tests of certain GUT are proton decay and fermion masses. There are a few more special tests for supersymmetric GUT. However, minimum proton lifetimes from research (at or exceeding the 10^{34}~10^{35} year range) have ruled out simpler GUTs and most non-SUSY models. The maximum upper limit on proton lifetime (if unstable), is calculated at 6×10^{39} years for SUSY models and 1.4×10^{36} years for minimal non-SUSY GUTs.

The gauge coupling strengths of QCD, the weak interaction and hypercharge seem to meet at a common length scale called the GUT scale and equal approximately to 10^{16} GeV (slightly less than the Planck energy of 10^{19} GeV), which is somewhat suggestive. This interesting numerical observation is called the gauge coupling unification, and it works particularly well if one assumes the existence of superpartners of the Standard Model particles. Still, it is possible to achieve the same by postulating, for instance, that ordinary (non supersymmetric) SO(10) models break with an intermediate gauge scale, such as the one of Pati–Salam group.

== See also ==
- Unification of theories in physics
- B − L quantum number
- Classical unified field theories
- Paradigm shift
- Physics beyond the Standard Model
- Theory of everything
- X and Y bosons
