= SO(10) =

Grand Unified Theory proposed in 1973

The pattern of weak isospin, W, weaker isospin, W′, strong g3 and g8, and baryon minus lepton, B, charges for particles in the SO(10) model, rotated to show the embedding of the Georgi–Glashow model and Standard Model, with electric charge roughly along the vertical. In addition to Standard Model particles, the theory includes 30 colored X bosons, responsible for proton decay, and two W′ bosons

The pattern of charges for particles in the SO(10) model, rotated to show the embedding in E6

In particle physics, SO(10) refers to a Grand Unified Theory (GUT) based on the spin group Spin(10). The shortened name SO(10) is conventional among physicists, and derives from the Lie algebra or less precisely the Lie group of SO(10), which is a special orthogonal group that is double covered by Spin(10).

SO(10) subsumes the 1974 Georgi–Glashow and Pati–Salam models, and unifies all fermions in a generation into a single field. This requires 12 new gauge bosons, in addition to the 12 of SU(5) (Georgi–Glashow model) and 9 of SU(4) × SU(2) × SU(2) (Pati–Salam model).

== History ==
Before the SU(5) theory behind the Georgi–Glashow model, Harald Fritzsch and Peter Minkowski, and independently Howard Georgi, found that all the matter contents are incorporated into a single representation, spinorial 16 of SO(10). However, Georgi found the SO(10) theory just a few hours before finding SU(5) at the end of 1973.

== Important subgroups ==
It has the branching rules to [SU(5) × U(1)_{χ}] / Z _{5}.

$$45 \rightarrow 24_0 \oplus 10_{-4} \oplus \overline{10}_4 \oplus 1_0$$
$$16 \rightarrow 10_1 \oplus \bar{5}_{-3} \oplus 1_5$$
$$10 \rightarrow 5_{-2} \oplus \bar{5}_2.$$

If the hypercharge is contained within SU(5), this is the conventional Georgi–Glashow model, with the 16 as the matter fields, the 10 as the electroweak Higgs field and the 24 within the 45 as the Grand Unified Theory (GUT) Higgs field. The superpotential may then include renormalizable terms of the form Tr(45 ⋅ 45), Tr(45 ⋅ 45 ⋅ 45), 10 ⋅ 45 ⋅ 10, 10 ⋅ 16* ⋅ 16 and 16* ⋅ 16. The first three are responsible to the gauge symmetry breaking at low energies and give the Higgs mass, and the latter two give the matter particles masses and their Yukawa couplings to the Higgs.

There is another possible branching, under which the hypercharge is a linear combination of an SU(5) generator and χ. This is known as flipped SU(5).

Another important subgroup is either [SU(4) × SU(2)_{L} × SU(2)_{R}] / Z_{2} or Z_{2} ⋊ [SU(4) × SU(2)_{L} × SU(2)_{R}] / Z_{2}, depending upon whether or not the left–right symmetry is broken, yielding the Pati–Salam model, whose branching rule is

$$45 \rightarrow (15,1,1) \oplus (6,2,2) \oplus (1,3,1) \oplus (1,1,3)$$
$$16 \rightarrow (4,2,1)\oplus (\bar 4,1,2).$$

== Spontaneous symmetry breaking ==
The symmetry breaking of SO(10) is usually done with a combination of ( (a 45_{H} or a 54_{H}) and ((a 16_{H} and a 1̅6̅_{H}) or (a 126_{H} and a 1̅2̅6̅_{H})) ).

Choose a 54_{H}. When this Higgs field acquires a GUT scale vacuum expectation value (VEV), we have a symmetry breaking to Z_{2} ⋊ [SU(4) × SU(2)_{L} × SU(2)_{R}] / Z_{2}, i.e. the Pati–Salam model with a Z_{2} left–right symmetry.

If we have a 45_{H} instead, this Higgs field can acquire any VEV in a two dimensional subspace without breaking the standard model. Depending on the direction of this linear combination, we can break the symmetry to SU(5) × U(1), the Georgi–Glashow model with a U(1) (diag(1,1,1,1,1,−1,−1,−1,−1,−1)), flipped SU(5) (diag(1,1,1,−1,−1,−1,−1,−1,1,1)), SU(4) × SU(2) × U(1) (diag(0,0,0,1,1,0,0,0,−1,−1)), the minimal left–right model (diag(1,1,1,0,0,−1,−1,−1,0,0)) or SU(3) × SU(2) × U(1) × U(1) for any other nonzero VEV.

The choice diag(1,1,1,0,0,−1,−1,−1,0,0) is called the Dimopoulos–Wilczek mechanism aka the "missing VEV mechanism" and it is proportional to B−L.

The choice of a 16_{H} and a 1̅6̅_{H} breaks the gauge group down to the Georgi–Glashow SU(5). The same comment applies to the choice of a 126_{H} and a 1̅2̅6̅_{H}.

It is the combination of both a 45/54 and a 16/1̅6̅ or 126/1̅2̅6̅ that breaks SO(10) down to the Standard Model.

== Electroweak Higgs and the doublet–triplet splitting problem ==
The electroweak Higgs doublets come from an SO(10) 10_{H}. Unfortunately, this same 10 also contains triplets. The masses of the doublets have to be stabilized at the electroweak scale, which is many orders of magnitude smaller than the GUT scale whereas the triplets have to be really heavy in order to prevent triplet-mediated proton decays.

Among the solutions for it is the Dimopoulos–Wilczek mechanism, or the choice of diag(1,1,1,0,0,−1,−1,−1,0,0) of ⟨45⟩. Unfortunately, this is not stable once the 16/1̅6̅ or 126/1̅2̅6̅ sector interacts with the 45 sector.

== Content ==
=== Matter ===

The matter representations come in three copies (generations) of the 16 representation. The Yukawa coupling is 10_{H} 16_{f} 16_{f}. This includes a right-handed neutrino. One may either include three copies of singlet representations φ and a Yukawa coupling ⟨1̅6̅_{H}⟩ 16_{f} φ (the "double seesaw mechanism"); or else, add the Yukawa interaction ⟨1̅2̅6̅_{H}⟩ 16_{f} 16_{f} or add the nonrenormalizable coupling ⟨1̅6̅_{H}⟩ ⟨1̅6̅_{H}⟩ 16_{f} 16_{f}.

The 16_{f} field branches to [SU(5) × U(1)_{χ}] / Z_{5} and SU(4) × SU(2)_{L} × SU(2)_{R} as

$$16 \rightarrow 10_1 \oplus \bar{5}_{-3} \oplus 1_5$$
$$16 \rightarrow (4,2,1)\oplus (\bar 4,1,2).$$

=== Gauge fields ===
The 45 field branches to [SU(5) × U(1)_{χ}] / Z_{5} and SU(4) × SU(2)_{L} × SU(2)_{R} as

$$45 \rightarrow 24_0 \oplus 10_{-4} \oplus \overline{10}_4 \oplus 1_0$$
$$45 \rightarrow (15,1,1) \oplus (6,2,2) \oplus (1,3,1) \oplus (1,1,3)$$

and to the standard model [SU(3)_{C} × SU(2)_{L} × U(1)_{Y}] / Z_{6} as

$$\begin{align} 45 \rightarrow & (8,1)_0 \oplus (1,3)_0 \oplus (1,1)_0 \oplus\\
&(3,2)_{-\frac{5}{6}} \oplus (\bar{3},2)_{\frac{5}{6}} \oplus\\
&(3,1)_{\frac{2}{3}} \oplus (\bar{3},1)_{-\frac{2}{3}} \oplus (1,1)_1 \oplus (1,1)_{-1} \oplus (1,1)_0\oplus\\
&(3,2)_{\frac{1}{6}} \oplus (\bar{3},2)_{-\frac{1}{6}}.\\
\end{align}$$

The four lines are the SU(3)_{C}, SU(2)_{L}, and U(1)_{B−L} bosons; the SU(5) leptoquarks that do not mutate X charge; the Pati–Salam leptoquarks and SU(2)_{R} bosons; and the new SO(10) leptoquarks. (The standard electroweak U(1)_{Y} is a linear combination of the (1, 1)_{0} bosons.)

== Proton decay ==
Graphics refer to the X bosons and Higgs bosons.

Dimension 6 proton decay mediated by the X boson $(3,2)_{-\frac{5}{6}}$ in SU(5) GUT

Dimension 6 proton decay mediated by the X boson $(3,2)_{\frac{1}{6}}$ in flipped SU(5) GUT

Note that SO(10) contains both the Georgi–Glashow SU(5) and flipped SU(5).

== Anomaly free from local and global anomalies ==
It has been long known that the SO(10) model is free from all perturbative local anomalies, computable by Feynman diagrams. However, it only became clear in 2018 that the SO(10) model is also free from all nonperturbative global anomalies on non-spin manifolds – an important rule for confirming the consistency of SO(10) grand unified theory, with a Spin(10) gauge group and chiral fermions in the 16-dimensional spinor representations, defined on non-spin manifolds.

== See also ==
- Flipped SO(10)
