= Georgi–Jarlskog mass relation =

In Grand Unified Theories of the SU(5) or SO(10) type, there is a mass relation predicted between the electron and the down quark, the muon and the strange quark and the tau lepton and the bottom quark called the Georgi–Jarlskog mass relations. The relations were formulated by Howard Georgi and Cecilia Jarlskog.

At GUT scale, these are sometimes quoted as:

$$m_{e} \approx \frac{1}{3} m_{d GUT}$$

$$m_{\mu} \approx 3 m_{s GUT}$$

$$m_{\tau} \approx m_{b GUT}$$

In the same paper it is written that:

$$m_{d GUT} \approx \frac{1}{3} m_d$$

$$m_{s GUT} \approx \frac{1}{3} m_s$$

$$m_{b GUT} \approx \frac{1}{3} m_b$$

Meaning that:

$m_d \approx 9 m_e$ $error = 5\%$

$m_s \approx m_{\mu}$ $error = 21\%$

$m_b \approx 3 m_{\tau}$ $error = 26\%$

Current values for Lepton and Quark masses
Symbol	Description	Renormalization scheme (point)	Value
m_{e}	Electron mass		0.511 MeV
m_{u}	Up quark mass	μ_{M̅S̅} = 2 GeV	1.9 MeV
m_{d}	Down quark mass	μ_{M̅S̅} = 2 GeV	4.4 MeV
m_{s}	Strange quark mass	μ_{M̅S̅} = 2 GeV	87 MeV
m_{μ}	Muon mass		105.7 MeV
m_{c}	Charm quark mass	μ_{M̅S̅} = m_{c}	1.32 GeV
m_{τ}	Tau mass		1.78 GeV
m_{b}	Bottom quark mass	μ_{M̅S̅} = m_{b}	4.24 GeV
m_{t}	Top quark mass	On-shell scheme	172.7 GeV
