= Pati–Salam model =

Grand Unified Theory proposed in 1974

In physics, the Pati–Salam model is a Grand Unified Theory (GUT) proposed in 1974 by Jogesh Pati and Abdus Salam. Like other GUTs, its goal is to explain the seeming arbitrariness and complexity of the Standard Model in terms of a simpler, more fundamental theory that unifies, what are in the Standard Model, disparate particles and forces. The Pati–Salam unification is based on there being four quark color charges, dubbed red, green, blue and violet (or originally lilac), instead of the conventional three, with the new "violet" quark being identified with the leptons. The model also has left–right symmetry and predicts the existence of a high energy right handed weak interaction with heavy W' and Z' bosons and right-handed neutrinos.

Originally the fourth color was labelled "lilac" to alliterate with "lepton". Pati–Salam is an alternative to the Georgi–Glashow SU(5) unification also proposed in 1974. Both can be embedded within an SO(10) unification model.

== Core theory ==
The Pati–Salam model states that the gauge group is either SU(4) × SU(2)_{L} × SU(2)_{R} or (SU(4) × SU(2)_{L} × SU(2)_{R})/Z_{2} and the fermions form three families, each consisting of the representations (4, 2, 1) and (4̅, 1, 2). This needs some explanation. The center of SU(4) × SU(2)_{L} × SU(2)_{R} is Z_{4} × Z_{2L} × Z_{2R}. The Z_{2} in the quotient refers to the two element subgroup generated by the element of the center corresponding to the two element of Z_{4} and the 1 elements of Z_{2L} and Z_{2R}. This includes the right-handed neutrino. See neutrino oscillations. There is also a (4, 1, 2) and/or a (4̅, 1, 2) scalar field called the Higgs field which acquires a non-zero vacuum expectation value (VEV). This results in a spontaneous symmetry breaking from SU(4) × SU(2)_{L} × SU(2)_{R} to (SU(3) × SU(2) × U(1)_{Y})/Z_{3} or from (SU(4) × SU(2)_{L} × SU(2)_{R})/Z_{2} to (SU(3) × SU(2) × U(1)_{Y})/Z_{6} and also,

(4, 2, 1) → (3, 2)_{1/6} ⊕ (1, 2)_{− 1/2} (q & l)
(4̅, 1, 2) → (3̅, 1)_{1/3} ⊕ (3̅, 1)_{− 2/3} ⊕ (1, 1)_{1} ⊕ (1, 1)_{0} (d ^{c}, u^{c}, e^{c} & ν^{c})
(6, 1, 1) → (3, 1)_{− 1/3} ⊕ (3̅, 1)_{1/3}
(1, 3, 1) → (1, 3)_{0}
(1, 1, 3) → (1, 1)_{1} ⊕ (1, 1)_{0} ⊕ (1, 1)_{−1}

See restricted representation. Calling the representations things like (4̅, 1, 2) and (6, 1, 1) is purely a physicist's convention, not a mathematician's convention, where representations are either labelled by Young diagrams or by Dynkin diagrams with numbers on their vertices, but still, it is standard among GUT theorists.

The weak hypercharge, Y, is the sum of the two matrices:

$$\begin{pmatrix}\frac{1}{3}&0&0&0\\0&\frac{1}{3}&0&0\\0&0&\frac{1}{3}&0\\0&0&0&-1\end{pmatrix} \in \text{SU}(4), \qquad \begin{pmatrix}1&0\\0&-1\end{pmatrix} \in \text{SU}(2)_{\text{R}}$$

It is possible to extend the Pati–Salam group so that it has two connected components. The relevant group is now the semidirect product $\left ([\mathrm{SU}(4)\times \mathrm{SU}(2)_\mathrm{L}\times \mathrm{SU}(2)_\mathrm{R}]/\mathbf{Z}_2\right )\rtimes\mathbf{Z}_2$. The last Z_{2} also needs explaining. It corresponds to an automorphism of the (unextended) Pati–Salam group which is the composition of an involutive outer automorphism of SU(4) which isn't an inner automorphism with interchanging the left and right copies of SU(2). This explains the name left and right and is one of the main motivations for originally studying this model. This extra "left-right symmetry" restores the concept of parity which had been shown not to hold at low energy scales for the weak interaction. In this extended model, (4, 2, 1) ⊕ (4̅, 1, 2) is an irrep and so is (4, 1, 2) ⊕ (4̅, 2, 1). This is the simplest extension of the minimal left-right model unifying QCD with B−L.

Since the homotopy group

$$\pi_2\left(\frac{\mathrm{SU}(4)\times \mathrm{SU}(2)}{[\mathrm{SU}(3)\times \mathrm{U}(1)]/\mathbf{Z}_3}\right)=\mathbf{Z},$$

this model predicts monopoles. See 't Hooft–Polyakov monopole.

This model was invented by Jogesh Pati and Abdus Salam.

This model doesn't predict gauge mediated proton decay (unless it is embedded within an even larger GUT group).

== Differences from the SU(5) unification ==
As mentioned above, both the Pati–Salam and Georgi–Glashow SU(5) unification models can be embedded in a SO(10) unification. The difference between the two models then lies in the way that the SO(10) symmetry is broken, generating different particles that may or may not be important at low scales and accessible by current experiments. If we look at the individual models, the most important difference is in the origin of the weak hypercharge. In the SU(5) model by itself there is no left-right symmetry (although there could be one in a larger unification in which the model is embedded), and the weak hypercharge is treated separately from the color charge. In the Pati–Salam model, part of the weak hypercharge (often called U(1)_{B-L}) starts being unified with the color charge in the SU(4)_{C} group, while the other part of the weak hypercharge is in the SU(2)_{R}. When those two groups break then the two parts together eventually unify into the usual weak hypercharge U(1)_{Y}.

== Minimal supersymmetric Pati–Salam ==
- Spacetime: The N = 1 superspace extension of 3 + 1 Minkowski spacetime
- Spatial symmetry: N=1 SUSY over 3 + 1 Minkowski spacetime with R-symmetry
- Gauge symmetry group: (SU(4) × SU(2)_{L} × SU(2)_{R})/Z_{2}
- Global internal symmetry: U(1)_{A}
- Vector superfields: Those associated with the SU(4) × SU(2)_{L} × SU(2)_{R} gauge symmetry
- Left-right extension: We can extend this model to include left-right symmetry. For that, we need the additional chiral multiplets (4, 2, 1)_{H} and (4̅, 2, 1)_{H}.

=== Chiral superfields ===
As complex representations:

label	description	multiplicity	SU(4) × SU(2)_{L} × SU(2)_{R} rep	R	A
(4̅, 1, 2)_{H}	GUT Higgs field	1	(4, 1, 2)	0	0
(4̅, 1, 2)_{H}	GUT Higgs field	1	(4̅, 1, 2)	0	0
S	singlet	1	(1, 1, 1)	2	0
(1, 2, 2)_{H}	electroweak Higgs field	1	(1, 2, 2)	0	0
(6, 1, 1)_{H}	no name	1	(6, 1, 1)	2	0
(4, 2, 1)	left handed matter field	3	(4, 2, 1)	1	1
(4̅, 1, 2)	right handed matter field including right handed (sterile or heavy) neutrinos	3	(4̅, 1, 2)	1	−1

=== Superpotential ===
A generic invariant renormalizable superpotential is a (complex) SU(4) × SU(2)_{L} × SU(2)_{R} and U(1)_{R} invariant cubic polynomial in the superfields. It is a linear combination of the following terms:

$$\begin{matrix}
S \\
S(4,1,2)_H (\bar{4},1,2)_H\\
S(1,2,2)_H (1,2,2)_H \\
(6,1,1)_H (4,1,2)_H (4,1,2)_H\\
(6,1,1)_H (\bar{4},1,2)_H (\bar{4},1,2)_H\\
(1,2,2)_H (4,2,1)_i (\bar{4},1,2)_j\\
(4,1,2)_H (\bar{4},1,2)_i \phi_j\\
\end{matrix}$$

$i$ and $j$ are the generation indices.

== Sources ==
- Graham G. Ross, Grand Unified Theories, Benjamin/Cummings, 1985, ISBN 0-8053-6968-6
- Anthony Zee, Quantum Field Theory in a Nutshell, Princeton U. Press, Princeton, 2003, ISBN 0-691-01019-6
