= Harald Fritzsch =

German theoretical physicist (1943–2022)

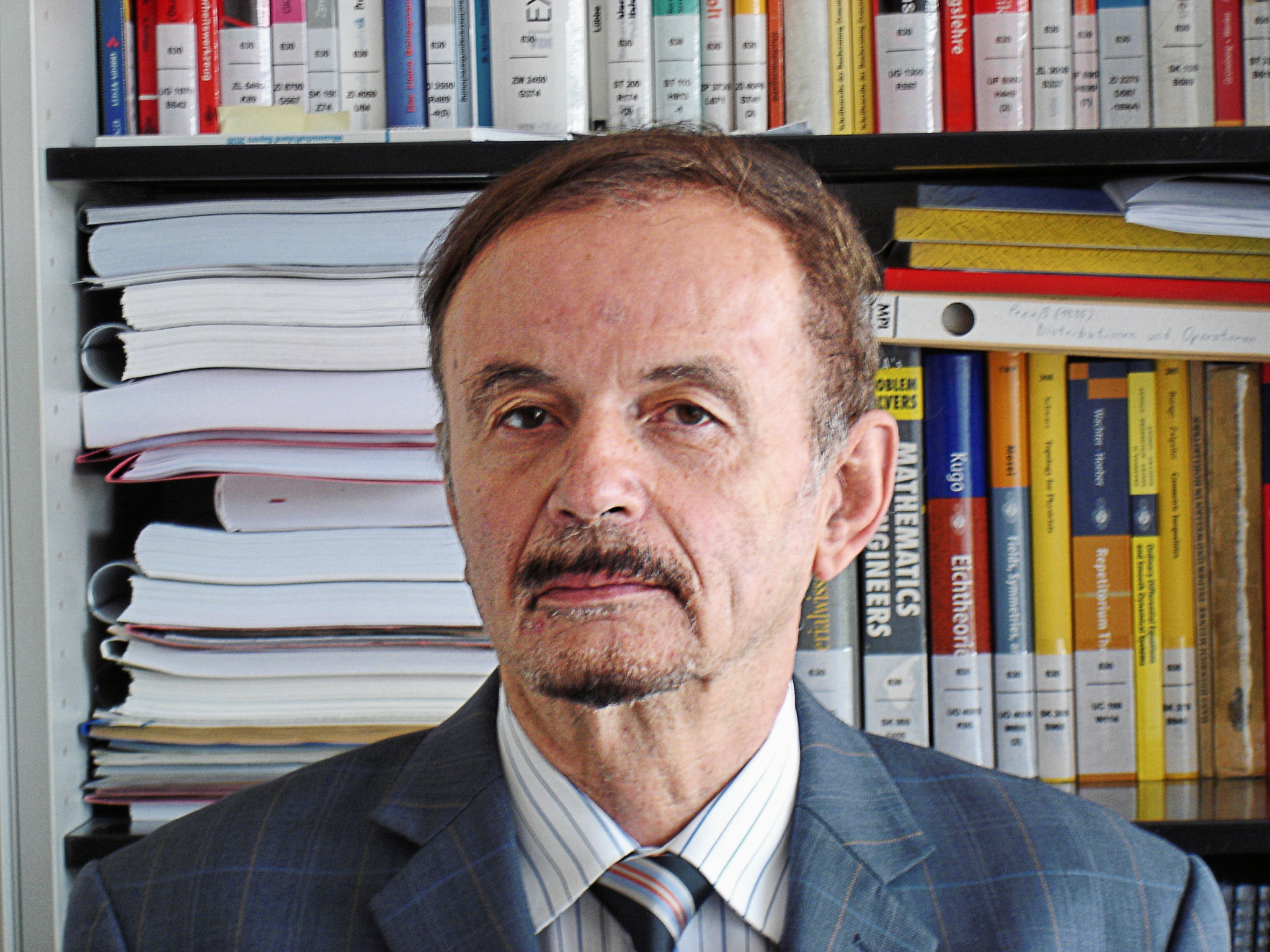
- Fritzsch in 2011
- Born: 10 February 1943; Zwickau, Germany
- Died: 16 August 2022 (aged 79); Munich, Germany
- Known for: Quantum chromodynamics SO(10); Fritzsch mass matrices
- Awards: UNSW Dirac Medal (2008)
- Scientific career
- Fields: Physics
- Institutions: CERN; California Institute of Technology; University of Wuppertal; University of Bern; LMU Munich
- Doctoral students: Marcus Hutter; Dieter Lüst

Harald Fritzsch (10 February 1943 in Zwickau, Germany – 16 August 2022 in Munich) was a German theoretical physicist known for his contributions to the theory of quarks, the development of quantum chromodynamics and the grand unification of the Standard Model of particle physics.

== Education and career ==
After completing his education in Zwickau 1961, he became a soldier in the Nationale Volksarmee of the GDR. He studied physics at Leipzig University from 1963 to 1968, where he completed his Diplom under Hans-Juergen Treder. After fleeing to West Germany, Fritzsch continued his studies at LMU Munich where he finished his Ph.D. under the supervision of Heinrich Mitter.

In 1970 Fritzsch visited the Aspen Center for Physics, where he met Murray Gell-Mann. They started a collaboration, first in Aspen, later at the California Institute of Technology. In 1971, they introduced the concept of the colour charge quantum number which allowed them in collaboration with William A. Bardeen to explain the decay rate of pions. In the fall of 1971 Fritzsch and Gell-Mann moved to Geneva in Switzerland, where they worked together at CERN. They proposed a gauge theory for the strong interaction, which now is called Quantum Chromodynamics. In September 1972 they moved back to Caltech. In 1975 Fritzsch published a paper together with Peter Minkowski in which they proposed the symmetry group SO(10) as the symmetry of the Grand Unified Theory which has become a standard theory. In 1976 Fritzsch moved to CERN. After working for one year at the University of Wuppertal and the University of Bern, Fritzsch was appointed Professor at LMU Munich in 1980.

Fritzsch worked also on "composite models" of leptons and quarks, mass matrices of quarks and leptons, weak decays of heavy quarks, cosmology and the fundamental constants of physics. He retired in 2008 and died 16 August 2022 in Munich.

In 1971, Fritzsch married Brigitte Goralski. They had two children.

== Works ==
- Quarks: The Stuff of Matter (1989, ISBN 978-0-465-06784-8)
- The Creation of Matter: The Universe from Beginning to End (1984, ISBN 978-0-465-01446-0)
- An Equation That Changed the World: Newton, Einstein, and the Theory of Relativity (1997, ISBN 0-226-26558-7)
- The Curvature of Spacetime: Newton, Einstein, and Gravitation (2005, ISBN 978-0-231-11821-7)
- Elementary Particles: Building Blocks of Matter (2005, ISBN 978-981-256-408-5)
- Escape From Leipzig (2008, ISBN 978-981-279-306-5)
- The Fundamental Constants: A Mystery of Physics (2009, ISBN 978-981-283-432-4 (paperback)); ISBN 978-981-281-819-5 hbk.
- You Are Wrong, Mr Einstein!: Newton, Einstein, Heisenberg and Feynman Discussing Quantum Mechanics (2011, ISBN 978-981-4324-99-1)
- Microcosmos: The World of Elementary Particles: Fictional Discussions between Einstein, Newton, and Gell-Mann (2013, ISBN 978-981-4449-98-4)
- 50 Years of Quarks (with Murray Gell-Mann, 2015, ISBN 978-981-4618-10-6)
