= Doublet–triplet splitting problem =

In particle physics, the doublet–triplet (splitting) problem is a problem of some Grand Unified Theories, such as SU(5), SO(10), and $E_6$. Grand Unified Theories predict Higgs bosons (doublets of $SU(2)$) arise from representations of the unified group that contain other states, in particular, states that are triplets of color. The primary problem with these color triplet Higgs is that they can mediate proton decay in supersymmetric theories that are only suppressed by two powers of GUT scale (i.e. they are dimension 5 supersymmetric operators). In addition to mediating proton decay, they alter gauge coupling unification. The doublet–triplet problem is the question 'what keeps the doublets light while the triplets are heavy?'

== Doublet–triplet splitting and the μ-problem ==
In 'minimal' SU(5), the way one accomplishes doublet–triplet splitting is through a combination of interactions

$$\int d^2\theta \; \lambda  H_{\bar{5}} \Sigma  H_{5} + \mu H_{\bar{5}} H_{5}$$

where $\Sigma$ is an adjoint of SU(5) and is traceless. When $\Sigma$ acquires a vacuum expectation value

$$\langle \Sigma\rangle = \operatorname{diag}(2, 2, 2, -3, -3) f$$

that breaks SU(5) to the Standard Model gauge symmetry the Higgs doublets and triplets acquire a mass

$$\int d^2\theta \;  (2 \lambda f + \mu) H_{\bar{3}}H_3 + (-3\lambda f +\mu) H_{\bar{2}}H_2$$

Since $f$ is at the GUT scale ($10^{16}$ GeV) and the Higgs doublets need to have a weak scale mass (100 GeV), this requires

$$\mu \sim 3 \lambda f \pm 100 \mbox{GeV}$$.

So to solve this doublet–triplet splitting problem requires a tuning of the two terms to within one part in $10^{14}$. This is also why the mu problem of the MSSM (i.e. why are the Higgs doublets so light) and doublet–triplet splitting are so closely intertwined.

== Solutions to the doublet-triplet splitting ==
=== The missing partner mechanism ===
One solution to the doublet–triplet splitting (DTS) in the context of supersymmetric $SU(5)$ proposed in and is called the missing partner mechanism (MPM). The main idea is that in addition to the usual fields there are two additional chiral super-fields $Z_{50}$ and $Z_{\overline{50}}$. Note that ${\mathbf{50}}$ decomposes as follows under the SM gauge group:

$$\mathbf{50}\rightarrow(\mathbf{1},\mathbf{1},-2)+(\mathbf{3},\mathbf{1},-\frac 13)+(\overline{\mathbf{3}},\mathbf{2},-\frac 76)+(\mathbf{6},\mathbf{1},\frac 43)+(\overline{\mathbf{6}},\mathbf{3},-\frac 13)+(\mathbf{8},\mathbf{2},\frac 12)$$

which contains no field that could couple to the $SU(2)$ doublets of $H_{\overline{5}}$ or $H_{{5}}$. Due to group theoretical reasons $SU(5)$ has to be broken by a $\mathbf{75}$ instead of the usual $\mathbf{24}$, at least at the renormalizable level. The superpotential then reads

$$W_{MPM}=y_1 H_{\overline{5}}H_{75}Z_{50}+y_2 Z_{\overline{50}}H_{75}H_{5}+m_{50}Z_{{50}}Z_{\overline{50}}.$$

After breaking to the SM the colour triplet can get super heavy, suppressing proton decay, while the SM Higgs does not. Note that nevertheless the SM Higgs will have to pick up a mass in order to reproduce the electroweak theory correctly.

Note that although solving the DTS problem the MPM tends to render models non-perturbative just above the GUT scale. This problem is addressed by the Double missing partner mechanism.

=== Dimopoulos–Wilczek mechanism ===
In an SO(10) theory, there is a potential solution to the doublet–triplet splitting problem known as the 'Dimopoulos–Wilczek' mechanism. In SO(10), the adjoint field, $\Sigma$ acquires a vacuum expectation value of the form

$\langle \Sigma \rangle = \mbox{diag}( i \sigma_2 f_3, i\sigma_2 f_3, i\sigma_2 f_3, i\sigma_2 f_2, i \sigma_2 f_2)$.

$f_2$ and $f_3$ give masses to the Higgs doublet and triplet, respectively, and are independent of each other, because $\Sigma$ is traceless for any values they may have. If $f_2=0$, then the Higgs doublet remains massless. This is very similar to the way that doublet–triplet splitting is done in either higher-dimensional grand unified theories or string theory.

To arrange for the VEV to align along this direction (and still not mess up the other details of the model) often requires very contrived models, however.

== Higgs representations in Grand Unified Theories ==
In SU(5):

$$5\rightarrow (1,2)_{1\over 2}\oplus (3,1)_{-{1\over 3}}$$
$$\bar{5}\rightarrow (1,2)_{-{1\over 2}}\oplus (\bar{3},1)_{1\over 3}$$

In SO(10):

$$10\rightarrow (1,2)_{1\over 2}\oplus (1,2)_{-{1\over 2}}\oplus (3,1)_{-{1\over 3}}\oplus (\bar{3},1)_{1\over 3}$$

== Proton decay ==
Dimension 6 proton decay mediated by the triplet Higgs $T (3,1)_{-\frac{1}{3}}$ and the anti-triplet Higgs $\bar{T} (\bar{3},1)_{\frac{1}{3}}$ in $SU(5)$ GUT

Non-supersymmetric theories suffer from quartic radiative corrections to the mass squared of the electroweak Higgs boson (see hierarchy problem). In the presence of supersymmetry, the triplet Higgsino needs to be more massive than the GUT scale to prevent proton decay because it generates dimension 5 operators in Minimal Supersymmetric Standard Model; there it is not enough simply to require the triplet to have a GUT scale mass.
