= Flipped SU(5) =

Grand unified theory

The Flipped SU(5) model is a Grand Unified Theory (GUT) first contemplated by Stephen Barr in 1982, and by Dimitri Nanopoulos and others in 1984. Ignatios Antoniadis, John Ellis, John Hagelin, and Dimitri Nanopoulos developed the supersymmetric flipped SU(5), derived from the deeper-level superstring.

In 2010, efforts to explain the theoretical underpinnings for observed neutrino masses were being developed in the context of supersymmetric flipped SU(5).

Flipped SU(5) is not a fully unified model, because the U(1)_{Y} factor of the Standard Model gauge group is within the U(1) factor of the GUT group. The addition of states below Mx in this model, while solving certain threshold correction issues in string theory, makes the model merely descriptive, rather than predictive.

== The model ==
The flipped SU(5) model states that the gauge group is:

(SU(5) × U(1)_{χ})/Z_{5}

Fermions form three families, each consisting of the representations

5̅_{−3} for the lepton doublet, L, and the up quarks u^{c};
10_{1} for the quark doublet, Q, the down quark, d^{c} and the right-handed neutrino, N;
1_{5} for the charged leptons, e^{c}.

This assignment includes three right-handed neutrinos, which have never been observed, but are often postulated to explain the lightness of the observed neutrinos and neutrino oscillations. There is also a 10_{1} and/or 1̅0̅_{−1} called the Higgs fields which acquire a VEV, yielding the spontaneous symmetry breaking

(SU(5) × U(1)_{χ})/Z_{5} → (SU(3) × SU(2) × U(1)_{Y})/Z_{6}

The SU(5) representations transform under this subgroup as the reducible representation as follows:

$\bar{5}_{-3}\to (\bar{3},1)_{-\frac{2}{3}}\oplus (1,2)_{-\frac{1}{2}}$ (u^{c} and l)
$10_{1}\to (3,2)_{\frac{1}{6}}\oplus (\bar{3},1)_{\frac{1}{3}}\oplus (1,1)_0$ (q, d^{c} and ν^{c})
$1_{5}\to (1,1)_1$ (e^{c})
$$24_0\to (8,1)_0\oplus (1,3)_0\oplus (1,1)_0\oplus (3,2)_{\frac{1}{6}}\oplus (\bar{3},2)_{-\frac{1}{6}}$$.

== Comparison with the standard SU(5) ==
The name "flipped" SU(5) arose in comparison to the "standard" SU(5) Georgi–Glashow model, in which u^{c} and d^{c} quark are respectively assigned to the 10 and 5 representation. In comparison with the standard SU(5), the flipped SU(5) can accomplish the spontaneous symmetry breaking using Higgs fields of dimension 10, while the standard SU(5) typically requires a 24-dimensional Higgs.

The sign convention for U(1)_{χ} varies from article/book to article.

The hypercharge Y/2 is a linear combination (sum) of the following:

$$\begin{pmatrix}{1 \over 15}&0&0&0&0\\0&{1 \over 15}&0&0&0\\0&0&{1 \over 15}&0&0\\0&0&0&-{1 \over 10}&0\\0&0&0&0&-{1 \over 10}\end{pmatrix}\in \text{SU}(5), \qquad \chi/5.$$

There are also the additional fields 5_{−2} and 5̅_{2} containing the electroweak Higgs doublets.

Calling the representations for example, 5̅_{−3} and 24_{0} is purely a physicist's convention, not a mathematician's convention, where representations are either labelled by Young tableaux or Dynkin diagrams with numbers on their vertices, and is a standard used by GUT theorists.

Since the homotopy group

$$\pi_2\left(\frac{[SU(5)\times U(1)_\chi]/\mathbf{Z}_5}{[SU(3)\times SU(2)\times U(1)_Y]/\mathbf{Z}_6}\right)=0$$

this model does not predict monopoles. See 't Hooft–Polyakov monopole.

Dimension 6 proton decay mediated by the X boson $(3,2)_{\frac{1}{6}}$ in flipped SU(5) GUT

== Minimal supersymmetric flipped SU(5) ==
=== Spacetime ===
The N = 1 superspace extension of 3 + 1 Minkowski spacetime

=== Spatial symmetry ===
N = 1 SUSY over 3 + 1 Minkowski spacetime with R-symmetry

=== Gauge symmetry group ===
(SU(5) × U(1)_{χ})/Z_{5}

=== Global internal symmetry ===
Z_{2} (matter parity) not related to U(1)_{R} in any way for this particular model

=== Vector superfields ===
Those associated with the SU(5) × U(1)_{χ} gauge symmetry

=== Chiral superfields ===
As complex representations:

label	description	multiplicity	SU(5) × U(1)_{χ} rep	Z_{2} rep	U(1)_{R}
10_{H}	GUT Higgs field	1	10_{1}	+	0
1̅0̅_{H}	GUT Higgs field	1	1̅0̅_{−1}	+	0
H_{u}	electroweak Higgs field	1	5̅_{2}	+	2
H_{d}	electroweak Higgs field	1	5_{−2}	+	2
5̅	matter fields	3	5̅_{−3}	-	0
10	matter fields	3	10_{1}	-	0
1	left-handed positron	3	1_{5}	-	0
φ	sterile neutrino (optional)	3	1_{0}	-	2
S	singlet	1	1_{0}	+	2

=== Superpotential ===
A generic invariant renormalizable superpotential is a (complex) SU(5) × U(1)_{χ} × Z_{2} invariant cubic polynomial in the superfields which has an R-charge of 2. It is a linear combination of the following terms:

$$\begin{matrix}
S&S\\
S 10_H \overline{10}_H & S 10_H^{\alpha\beta} \overline{10}_{H\alpha\beta}\\
10_H 10_H H_d&\epsilon_{\alpha\beta\gamma\delta\epsilon}10_H^{\alpha\beta}10_H^{\gamma\delta} H_d^{\epsilon}\\
\overline{10}_H\overline{10}_H H_u&\epsilon^{\alpha\beta\gamma\delta\epsilon}\overline{10}_{H\alpha\beta}\overline{10}_{H\gamma\delta}H_{u\epsilon}\\
H_d 10 10&\epsilon_{\alpha\beta\gamma\delta\epsilon}H_d^{\alpha}10_i^{\beta\gamma}10_j^{\delta\epsilon}\\
H_d \bar{5} 1 &H_d^\alpha \bar{5}_{i\alpha} 1_j\\
H_u 10 \bar{5}&H_{u\alpha} 10_i^{\alpha\beta} \bar{5}_{j\beta}\\
\overline{10}_H 10 \phi&\overline{10}_{H\alpha\beta} 10_i^{\alpha\beta} \phi_j\\
\end{matrix}$$

The second column expands each term in index notation (neglecting the proper normalization coefficient). i and j are the generation indices. The coupling H_{d} 10_{i} 10_{j} has coefficients which are symmetric in i and j.

In those models without the optional φ sterile neutrinos, we add the nonrenormalizable couplings instead.

$$\begin{matrix}
(\overline{10}_H 10)(\overline{10}_H 10)&\overline{10}_{H\alpha\beta}10^{\alpha\beta}_i \overline{10}_{H\gamma\delta} 10^{\gamma\delta}_j\\
\overline{10}_H 10 \overline{10}_H 10&\overline{10}_{H\alpha\beta}10^{\beta\gamma}_i\overline{10}_{H\gamma\delta}10^{\delta\alpha}_j
\end{matrix}$$

These couplings do break the R-symmetry.

== See also ==
- Flipped SO(10)
