= 331 model =

The 331 model in particle physics is an extension of the electroweak gauge symmetry which offers an explanation of why there must be three families of quarks and leptons. The name "331" comes from the full gauge symmetry group $SU(3)_C \times SU(3)_L \times U(1)_X\,$.

== Details ==
The 331 model in particle physics is an extension of the electroweak gauge symmetry from $SU(2)_L \times U(1)_Y$ to $\,SU(3)_L \times U(1)_X\,$ with $SU(2)_L \subset SU(3)_L$.

In the 331 model, hypercharge is given by

$$Y = \beta\,T_8 + I\,X$$

and electric charge is given by

$$Q = \frac{Y + T_3}{2}$$

where $T_3$ and $T_8$ are the Gell-Mann matrices of SU(3)_{L} and $\beta$ and $I$ are parameters of the model.

== Motivation ==
The 331 model offers an explanation of why there must be three families of quarks and leptons. One curious feature of the Standard Model is that the gauge anomalies independently exactly cancel for each of the three known quark-lepton families. The Standard Model thus offers no explanation of why there are three families, or indeed why there is more than one family.

The idea behind the 331 model is to extend the standard model such that all three families are required for anomaly cancellation. More specifically, in this model the three families transform differently under an extended gauge group. The perfect cancellation of the anomalies within each family is ruined, but the anomalies of the extended gauge group cancel when all three families are present. The cancellation will persist for 6, 9, ... families, so having only the three families observed in nature is the least possible matter content.

Such a construction necessarily requires the addition of further gauge bosons and chiral fermions, which then provide testable predictions of the model in the form of elementary particles. These particles could be found experimentally at masses above the electroweak scale, which is on the order of 10^{2} - 10^{3} GeV. The minimal 331 model predicts singly and doubly charged spin-one bosons, bileptons, which could show up in electron-electron scattering when it is studied at TeV energy scales and may also be produced in multi-TeV proton–proton scattering at the Large Hadron Collider which can reach 10^{4} GeV.

== See also ==
- Physics beyond the Standard Model
