= Jogesh Pati =

American physicist

- Born: 1937 (age 88–89); Baripada, Odisha, British India
- Citizenship: United States
- Education: Ravenshaw College; University of Delhi; University of Maryland
- Known for: Pati–Salam model
- Awards: Dirac Medal (2000); Padma Bhushan (2013)
- Scientific career
- Fields: Theoretical physics
- Workplaces: University of Maryland

Jogesh C. Pati (born 1937) is an Indian-American theoretical physicist at the SLAC National Accelerator Laboratory. With Abdus Salam, he is known for the Pati–Salam model.

== Biography ==
Jogesh Pati started his schooling at Guru Training School, Baripada and then admitted to M.K.C High School where he passed the Matriculation. He was admitted in MPC College and passed I Sc.

Pati earned B.Sc. from Ravenshaw College, Utkal University in 1955; M.Sc. from Delhi University in 1957; and Ph.D. from University of Maryland, College Park in 1961.

He is a professor emeritus at the University of Maryland in the Maryland Center for Fundamental Physics and physics department, which are part of the University of Maryland College of Computer, Mathematical, and Natural Sciences.

Pati has made pioneering contributions to the notion of a unification of elementary particles – quarks and leptons – and of their gauge forces: weak, electromagnetic, and strong. His formulation, carried out in collaboration with Nobel Laureate Abdus Salam, of the original gauge theory of quark–lepton unification, and their resulting insight that violations of baryon and lepton numbers, especially those that would manifest in proton decay, are likely consequences of such a unification, provide cornerstones of modern particle physics today. The suggestions of Pati and Salam (the Pati–Salam model) of the symmetry of SU(4)–color, left–right symmetry, and of the associated existence of right-handed neutrinos, now provide some of the crucial ingredients for understanding the observed masses of the neutrinos and their oscillations.

== Recognition ==
Pati was awarded the Dirac Medal for his seminal contributions to a "Quest for Unification" in the year 2000 along with Howard Georgi and Helen Quinn. In 2013, Pati was conferred the honor of Padma Bhushan, the 3rd highest civilian award from the Govt. of India.

== See also ==
- List of people from Odisha
