= Georgi–Glashow model =

Grand Unified Theory proposed in 1974

The pattern of weak isospins, weak hypercharges, and strong charges for particles in the Georgi–Glashow model, rotated by the predicted weak mixing angle, showing electric charge roughly along the vertical. In addition to Standard Model particles, the theory includes twelve colored X bosons, responsible for proton decay.

In particle physics, the Georgi–Glashow model is a particular Grand Unified Theory (GUT) proposed by Howard Georgi and Sheldon Glashow in 1974. In this model, the Standard Model gauge groups SU(3) × SU(2) × U(1) are combined into a single simple gauge group SU(5). The unified group SU(5) is then thought to be spontaneously broken into the Standard Model subgroup below a very high energy scale called the grand unification scale.

Since the Georgi–Glashow model combines leptons and quarks into single irreducible representations, there exist interactions which do not conserve baryon number, although they still conserve the quantum number B – L associated with the symmetry of the common representation. This yields a mechanism for proton decay, and the rate of proton decay can be predicted from the dynamics of the model. However, proton decay has not yet been observed experimentally, and the resulting lower limit on the lifetime of the proton contradicts the predictions of this model. Nevertheless, the elegance of the model has led particle physicists to use it as the foundation for more complex models which yield longer proton lifetimes, particularly SO(10) in basic and SUSY variants.

(For a more elementary introduction to how the representation theory of Lie algebras are related to particle physics, see the article Particle physics and representation theory.)

Also, this model suffers from the doublet–triplet splitting problem.

== Construction ==
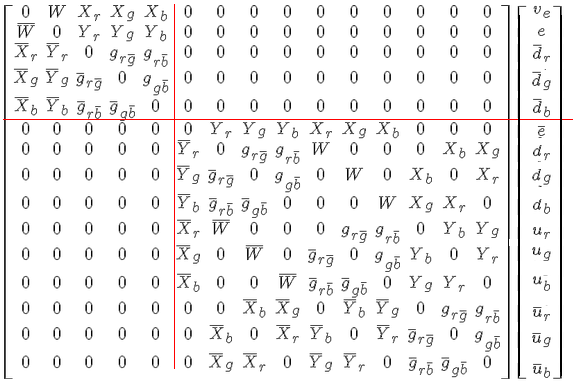
Schematic representation of fermions and bosons in SU(5) GUT showing 5 + 10 split in the multiplets. Row for 1 (the sterile neutrino singlet) is omitted, but would likewise be isolated. Neutral bosons (photon, Z-boson, and neutral gluons) are not shown but occupy the diagonal entries of the matrix in complex superpositions.

SU(5) acts on $\mathbb{C}^5$ and hence on its exterior algebra $\wedge\mathbb{C}^5$. Choosing a $\mathbb{C}^2\oplus\mathbb{C}^3$ splitting restricts SU(5) to S(U(2)×U(3)), yielding matrices of the form

$$\begin{matrix}
\phi: & U(1)\times SU(2)\times SU(3) & \longrightarrow & S(U(2)\times U(3)) \subset SU(5) \\
& (\alpha, g, h) & \longmapsto &
\begin{pmatrix}
\alpha^3 g & 0\\
0 & \alpha^{-2}h
\end{pmatrix}\\
\end{matrix}$$

with kernel $\{(\alpha, \alpha^{-3} \mathrm{Id}_2, \alpha^2 \mathrm{Id}_3) | \alpha \in \mathbb C , \alpha ^6 = 1 \}\cong \mathbb Z_6$, hence isomorphic to the Standard Model's true gauge group $SU(3)\times SU(2)\times U(1)/\mathbb{Z}_6$. For the zeroth power ${\textstyle\bigwedge}^0\mathbb{C}^5$, this acts trivially to match a left-handed neutrino, $\mathbb{C}_0\otimes\mathbb{C}\otimes\mathbb{C}$. For the first exterior power ${\textstyle\bigwedge}^1\mathbb{C}^5 \cong \mathbb{C}^5$, the Standard Model's group action preserves the splitting $\mathbb{C}^5 \cong \mathbb{C}^2\oplus\mathbb{C}^3$. The $\mathbb{C}^2$ transforms trivially in SU(3), as a doublet in SU(2), and under the Y = 1/2 representation of U(1) (as weak hypercharge is conventionally normalized as α^{3} = α^{6Y}); this matches a right-handed anti-lepton, $\mathbb{C}_{\frac 1 2}\otimes\mathbb{C}^{2*}\otimes\mathbb{C}$ (as $\mathbb{C}^{2}\cong\mathbb{C}^{2*}$ in SU(2)). The $\mathbb{C}^3$ transforms as a triplet in SU(3), a singlet in SU(2), and under the Y = −1/3 representation of U(1) (as α^{−2} = α^{6Y}); this matches a right-handed down quark, $\mathbb{C}_{-\frac 1 3}\otimes\mathbb{C}\otimes\mathbb{C}^3$.

The second power ${\textstyle\bigwedge}^2\mathbb{C}^5$ is obtained via the formula ${\textstyle\bigwedge}^2(V\oplus W)={\textstyle\bigwedge}^2 V^2 \oplus (V\otimes W) \oplus {\textstyle\bigwedge}^2 W^2$. As SU(5) preserves the canonical volume form of $\mathbb{C}^5$, Hodge duals give the upper three powers by ${\textstyle\bigwedge}^p\mathbb{C}^5\cong({\textstyle\bigwedge}^{5-p}\mathbb{C}^5)^*$. Thus the Standard Model's representation F ⊕ F* of one generation of fermions and antifermions lies within $\wedge\mathbb{C}^5$.

Similar motivations apply to the Pati–Salam model, and to SO(10), E6, and other supergroups of SU(5).

== Explicit embedding of the Standard Model ==
Owing to its relatively simple gauge group $SU(5)$ , GUTs can be written in terms of vectors and matrices which allows for an intuitive understanding of the Georgi–Glashow model. The fermion sector is then composed of an anti fundamental $\overline{\mathbf{5}}$ and an antisymmetric $\mathbf{10}$. In terms of SM degrees of freedoms, this can be written as

$$\overline{\mathbf{5}}_F=\begin{pmatrix}d_{1}^c\\d_{2}^c\\d_{3}^c\\e\\-\nu\end{pmatrix}$$

and

$$\mathbf {10}_F=\begin{pmatrix}
0&u_{3}^c&-u_{2}^c&u_1&d_1\\
-u_{3}^c&0&u_{1}^c&u_2&d_2\\
u_{2}^c&-u_{1}^c&0&u_3&d_3\\
-u_1&-u_2&-u_3&0&e_R\\
-d_1&-d_2&-d_3&-e_R&0
\end{pmatrix}$$

with $d_i$ and $u_i$ the left-handed up and down type quark, $d_i^c$ and $u_i^c$ their righthanded counterparts, $\nu$ the neutrino, $e$ and $e_R$ the left and right-handed electron, respectively.

In addition to the fermions, we need to break $SU(3)\times SU_L(2)\times U_Y(1)\rightarrow SU(3)\times U_{EM}(1)$; this is achieved in the Georgi–Glashow model via a fundamental $\mathbf{5}$ which contains the SM Higgs,

$$\mathbf{5}_H=(T_1,T_2,T_3,H^+,H^0)^T$$

with $H^+$ and $H^0$ the charged and neutral components of the SM Higgs, respectively. Note that the $T_i$ are not SM particles and are thus a prediction of the Georgi–Glashow model.

The SM gauge fields can be embedded explicitly as well. For that we recall a gauge field transforms as an adjoint, and thus can be written as $A^a_\mu T^a$ with $T^a$ the $SU(5)$ generators. Now, if we restrict ourselves to generators with non-zero entries only in the upper $3\times 3$ block, in the lower $2\times 2$ block, or on the diagonal, we can identify

$$\begin{pmatrix}G^a_\mu T^a_3&0\\0&0\end{pmatrix}$$

with the $SU(3)$ colour gauge fields,

$$\begin{pmatrix}0&0\\0&\frac{\sigma^a}{2}W^a_\mu\end{pmatrix}$$

with the weak $SU(2)$ fields, and

$$N\,B^0_\mu\operatorname{diag}\left(-1/3, -1/3, -1/3, 1/2, 1/2\right)$$

with the $U(1)$ hypercharge (up to some normalization $N$.) Using the embedding, we can explicitly check that the fermionic fields transform as they should.

This explicit embedding can be found in Ref. or in the original paper by Georgi and Glashow.

== Breaking SU(5) ==
SU(5) breaking occurs when a scalar field (Which we will denote as $\mathbf{24}_H$), analogous to the Higgs field and transforming in the adjoint of SU(5), acquires a vacuum expectation value (vev) proportional to the weak hypercharge generator

$$\langle \mathbf{24}_H\rangle=v_{24}\operatorname{diag}\left(-1/3, -1/3, -1/3, 1/2, 1/2\right)$$.

When this occurs, SU(5) is spontaneously broken to the subgroup of SU(5) commuting with the group generated by Y.

Using the embedding from the previous section, we can explicitly check that $SU(5)$ is indeed equal to $SU(3)\times SU(2)\times U(1)$ by noting that $[\langle \mathbf{24}_H\rangle,G_\mu]=[\langle \mathbf{24}_H\rangle,W_\mu]=[\langle \mathbf{24}_H\rangle,B_\mu]=0$. Computation of similar commutators further shows that all other $SU(5)$ gauge fields acquire masses.

To be precise, the unbroken subgroup is actually

$$[SU(3)\times SU(2)\times U(1)_Y]/\Z_6.$$

Under this unbroken subgroup, the adjoint 24 transforms as

$$\mathbf{24}\rightarrow (8,1)_0\oplus (1,3)_0\oplus (1,1)_0\oplus (3,2)_{-\frac{5}{6}}\oplus (\bar{3},2)_{\frac{5}{6}}$$

to yield the gauge bosons of the Standard Model plus the new X and Y bosons. See restricted representation.

The Standard Model's quarks and leptons fit neatly into representations of SU(5). Specifically, the left-handed fermions combine into 3 generations of $\ \overline{\mathbf{5}} \oplus\mathbf{10}\oplus\mathbf{1} ~.$ Under the unbroken subgroup these transform as

$$\begin{align}
\overline{\mathbf{5}} &\to (\bar{3},1)_{\tfrac{1}{3}}\oplus (1,2)_{-\tfrac{1}{2}} && \mathrm{d}^\mathsf{c} \mathsf{~ and ~} \ell \\
\mathbf{10} &\to (3,2)_{\tfrac{1}{6}}\oplus (\bar{3},1)_{-\tfrac{2}{3}}\oplus (1,1)_1 && q, \mathrm{u}^\mathsf{c} \mathsf{~ and ~} \mathrm{e}^\mathsf{c} \\
\mathbf{1}  &\to (1,1)_0 && \nu^\mathsf{c}
\end{align}$$

to yield precisely the left-handed fermionic content of the Standard Model where every generation d^{c}, u^{c}, e^{c}, and ν^{c} correspond to anti-down-type quark, anti-up-type quark, anti-down-type lepton, and anti-up-type lepton, respectively. Also, q and $\ell$ correspond to quark and lepton. Fermions transforming as 1 under SU(5) are now thought to be necessary because of the evidence for neutrino oscillations, unless a way is found to introduce an infinitesimal Majorana coupling for the left-handed neutrinos.

Since the homotopy group is

$$\pi_2\left(\frac{SU(5)}{[SU(3)\times SU(2)\times U(1)_Y]/\Z_6}\right)=\Z$$,

this model predicts 't Hooft–Polyakov monopoles.

Because the electromagnetic charge Q is a linear combination of some SU(2) generator with Y/2, these monopoles also have quantized magnetic charges Y, where by magnetic, here we mean magnetic electromagnetic charges.

== Minimal supersymmetric SU(5) ==
The minimal supersymmetric SU(5) model assigns a $\Z_2$ matter parity to the chiral superfields with the matter fields having odd parity and the Higgs having even parity to protect the electroweak Higgs from quadratic radiative mass corrections (the hierarchy problem). In the non-supersymmetric version the action is invariant under a similar $\Z_2$ symmetry because the matter fields are all fermionic and thus must appear in the action in pairs, while the Higgs fields are bosonic.

=== Chiral superfields ===
As complex representations:

label	description	multiplicity	SU(5) rep	$\Z_2$ rep
Φ	GUT Higgs field	1	24	+
H_{u}	electroweak Higgs field	1	5	+
H_{d}	electroweak Higgs field	1	$\overline{\mathbf{5}}$	+
$\overline{\mathbf{5}}$	matter fields	3	$\overline{\mathbf{5}}$	−
10	matter fields	3	10	−
N^{c}	sterile neutrinos	(fractal) 1 /2	1	−

=== Superpotential ===
A generic invariant renormalizable superpotential is a (complex) $SU(5)\times\Z_2$ invariant cubic polynomial in the superfields. It is a linear combination of the following terms:

$$\begin{matrix}
\Phi^2     & & \Phi^A_B \Phi^B_A \\[4pt]
\Phi^3     & & \Phi^A_B \Phi^B_C \Phi^C_A \\[4pt]
\mathrm{H}_\mathsf{d}\ \mathrm{H}_\mathsf{u}    & & {\mathrm{H}_\mathsf{d}}_A\ {\mathrm{H}_\mathsf{u}}^A \\[4pt]
\mathrm{H}_\mathsf{d}\ \Phi\ \mathrm{H}_\mathsf{u}                                 & & {\mathrm{H}_\mathsf{d}}_A\ \Phi^A_B\ {\mathrm{H}_\mathsf{u}}^B \\[4pt]
\mathrm{H}_\mathsf{u}\ \mathbf{10}_i \mathbf{10}_j              & & \epsilon_{ABCDE}\ {\mathrm{H}_\mathsf{u}}^A\ \mathbf{10}^{BC}_i\ \mathbf{10}^{DE}_j \\[4pt]
\mathrm{H}_\mathsf{d}\ \overline{\mathbf{5}}_i \mathbf{10}_j    & & {\mathrm{H}_\mathsf{d}}_A\ \overline{\mathbf{5}}_{Bi}\ \mathbf{10}^{AB}_j \\[4pt]
\mathrm{H}_\mathsf{u}\ \overline{\mathbf{5}}_i\ {\mathrm{N}^\mathsf{c}}_j            & & {\mathrm{H}_\mathsf{u}}^A\ \overline{\mathbf{5}}_{Ai}\ {\mathrm{N}^\mathsf{c}}_j \\[4pt]
{\mathrm{N}^\mathsf{c}}_i\ {\mathrm{N}^\mathsf{c}}_j                                  & & {\mathrm{N}^\mathsf{c}}_i\ {\mathrm{N}^\mathsf{c}}_j \\
\end{matrix}$$

The first column is an Abbreviation of the second column (neglecting proper normalization factors), where capital indices are SU(5) indices, and i and j are the generation indices.

The last two rows presupposes the multiplicity of $\ \mathrm{N}^\mathsf{c}\$ is not zero (i.e. that a sterile neutrino exists). The coupling $\ \mathrm{H}_\mathsf{u}\ \mathbf{10}_i\ \mathbf{10}_j\$ has coefficients which are symmetric in i and j. The coupling $\ \mathrm{N}^\mathsf{c}_i\ \mathrm{N}^\mathsf{c}_j\$ has coefficients which are symmetric in i and j. The number of sterile neutrino generations need not be three, unless the SU(5) is embedded in a higher unification scheme such as SO(10).

=== Vacua ===
The vacua correspond to the mutual zeros of the F and D terms. Let's first look at the case where the VEVs of all the chiral fields are zero except for Φ.

==== The Φ sector ====
$$\ W = Tr \left [a\Phi^2+b\Phi^3 \right ]\$$

The F zeros corresponds to finding the stationary points of W subject to the traceless constraint $\ Tr[\Phi]=0 ~.$ So, $\ 2a \Phi+3b\Phi^2 = \lambda \mathbf{1}\ ,$ where λ is a Lagrange multiplier.

Up to an SU(5) (unitary) transformation,

$$\Phi=\begin{cases}
\operatorname{diag}(0,0,0,0,0)\\
\operatorname{diag}(\frac{2a}{9b},\frac{2a}{9b},\frac{2a}{9b},\frac{2a}{9b},-\frac{8a}{9b})\\
\operatorname{diag}(\frac{4a}{3b},\frac{4a}{3b},\frac{4a}{3b},-\frac{2a}{b},-\frac{2a}{b})
\end{cases}$$

The three cases are called case I, II, and III and they break the gauge symmetry into $\ SU(5),\ \left[SU(4) \times U(1) \right]/\Z_4\$ and $\ \left[SU(3)\times SU(2) \times U(1)\right]/\Z_6$ respectively (the stabilizer of the VEV).

In other words, there are at least three different superselection sections, which is typical for supersymmetric theories.

Only case III makes any phenomenological sense and so, we will focus on this case from now onwards.

It can be verified that this solution together with zero VEVs for all the other chiral multiplets is a zero of the F-terms and D-terms. The matter parity remains unbroken (right up to the TeV scale).

==== Decomposition ====
The gauge algebra 24 decomposes as

$$\begin{pmatrix}(8,1)_0\\(1,3)_0\\(1,1)_0\\(3,2)_{-\frac{5}{6}}\\(\bar{3},2)_{\frac{5}{6}}\end{pmatrix} ~.$$

This 24 is a real representation, so the last two terms need explanation. Both $(3,2)_{-\frac{5}{6}}$ and $\ (\bar{3},2)_{\frac{5}{6}}\$ are complex representations. However, the direct sum of both representation decomposes into two irreducible real representations and we only take half of the direct sum, i.e. one of the two real irreducible copies. The first three components are left unbroken. The adjoint Higgs also has a similar decomposition, except that it is complex. The Higgs mechanism causes one real HALF of the $\ (3,2)_{-\frac{5}{6}}\$ and $\ (\bar{3},2)_{\frac{5}{6}}\$ of the adjoint Higgs to be absorbed. The other real half acquires a mass coming from the D-terms. And the other three components of the adjoint Higgs, $\ (8,1)_0, (1,3)_0\$ and $\ (1,1)_0\$ acquire GUT scale masses coming from self pairings of the superpotential, $\ a\Phi^2 +b <\Phi>\Phi^2 ~.$

The sterile neutrinos, if any exist, would also acquire a GUT scale Majorana mass coming from the superpotential coupling ν^{c}^{2} .

Because of matter parity, the matter representations $\ \overline{\mathbf{5}}\$ and 10 remain chiral.

It is the Higgs fields 5_{H} and $\ \overline{\mathbf{5}}_\mathrm{H}\$ which are interesting.

$5_\mathrm{H}$		$\bar{5}_\mathrm{H}$
$$\begin{pmatrix} (3,1)_{-\tfrac{1}{3}}\\ (1,2)_{\tfrac{1}{2}} \end{pmatrix}$$	$$\begin{matrix} \_\_\_\\ ??? \end{matrix}$$	$$\begin{pmatrix} (\bar{3},1)_{\tfrac{1}{3}}\\ (1,2)_{-\tfrac{1}{2}} \end{pmatrix}$$

The two relevant superpotential terms here are $\ 5_\mathrm{H}\ \bar{5}_\mathrm{H}\$ and $\ \langle24 \rangle5_\mathrm{H}\ \bar{5}_\mathrm{H} ~.$ Unless there happens to be some fine tuning, we would expect both the triplet terms and the doublet terms to pair up, leaving us with no light electroweak doublets. This is in complete disagreement with phenomenology. See doublet-triplet splitting problem for more details.

== Problems ==
=== Proton decay in SU(5) ===
The most common source of proton decay in SU(5). A left-handed and a right-handed up quark annihilate yielding an X^{+} boson which decays to a positron and an anti-down quark of opposite handedness.

Unification of the Standard Model via an SU(5) group has significant phenomenological implications. Most notable of these is proton decay which is present in SU(5) with and without supersymmetry. This is allowed by the new vector bosons introduced from the adjoint representation of SU(5) which also contains the gauge bosons of the Standard Model forces. Since these new gauge bosons are in (3,2)_{−5/6} bifundamental representations, they violated baryon and lepton number. As a result, the new operators should cause protons to decay at a rate inversely proportional to their masses. This process is called dimension 6 proton decay and is an issue for the model, since the proton is experimentally determined to have a lifetime greater than the age of the universe. This means that an SU(5) model is severely constrained by this process.

As well as these new gauge bosons, in SU(5) models, the Higgs field is usually embedded in a 5 representation of the GUT group. The caveat of this is that since the Higgs field is an SU(2) doublet, the remaining part, an SU(3) triplet, must be some new field - usually called D or T. This new scalar would be able to generate proton decay as well and, assuming the most basic Higgs vacuum alignment, would be massless so allowing the process at very high rates.

While not an issue in the Georgi–Glashow model, a supersymmeterised SU(5) model would have additional proton decay operators due to the superpartners of the Standard Model fermions. The lack of detection of proton decay (in any form) brings into question the veracity of SU(5) GUTs of all types; however, while the models are highly constrained by this result, they are not in general ruled out.

==== Mechanism ====
In the lowest-order Feynman diagram corresponding to the simplest source of proton decay in SU(5), a left-handed and a right-handed up quark annihilate yielding an X^{+} boson which decays to a right-handed (or left-handed) positron and a left-handed (or right-handed) anti-down quark:

$$\mathrm{u}_\mathsf{L} + \mathrm{u}_\mathsf{R} \to X^ + \to \mathrm{e}_\mathsf{R}^+ + \mathrm{\bar{d}}_\mathsf{L}\ ,$$

$$\mathrm{u}_\mathsf{L} + \mathrm{u}_\mathsf{R} \to X^+\to \mathrm{e}_\mathsf{L}^+ + \mathrm{\bar{d}}_\mathsf{R} ~.$$

This process conserves weak isospin, weak hypercharge, and color. GUTs equate anti-color with having two colors, $\ \bar{g} \equiv rb\ ,$ and SU(5) defines left-handed normal leptons as "white" and right-handed antileptons as "black". The first vertex only involves fermions of the 10 representation, while the second only involves fermions in the 5̅ (or 10), demonstrating the preservation of SU(5) symmetry.

=== Mass relations ===
Since SM states are regrouped into $SU(5)$ representations their Yukawa matrices have the following relations:

$$Y_\mathrm{d} = Y_\mathrm{e}^\mathsf{T} \quad \mathsf{and} \quad Y_\mathrm{u} = Y_\mathrm{u}^\mathsf{T}$$

In particular this predicts $m_{e,\mu,\tau}\approx m_{d,s,b}$ at energies close to the scale of unification. This is however not realized in nature.

=== Doublet-triplet splitting ===
As mentioned in the above section the colour triplet of the ${\mathbf{5}}$ which contains the SM Higgs can mediate dimension 6 proton decay. Since protons seem to be quite stable such a triplet has to acquire a quite large mass in order to suppress the decay. This is however problematic. For that consider the scalar part of the Greorgi-Glashow Lagrangian:

$$\mathcal L \supset{\mathbf{5}}_\mathrm{H}^\dagger(a+b\mathbf{24}_\mathrm{H} ){\mathbf{5}}_\mathrm{H} \overset{SSB}{\longrightarrow} (a+2bv_{24})T^\dagger T + (a-3bv_{24})H^\dagger H=m_\mathrm{T}^2 T^\dagger T - \mu^2 H^\dagger H$$

We here have denoted the adjoint used to break $\ SU(5)\$ to the SM with $\ \mathbf{24}_H\ ,$ T is VEV by $\ v_{24}\$ and $\ {\mathbf{5}}_\mathrm{H} = (T,H)^\mathsf{T}\$ the defining representation. which contains the SM Higgs $\ H\$ and the colour triplet $T$ which can induce proton decay. As mentioned, we require $\ m_\mathrm{T} > 10^{12}\ \mathrm{GeV}\$ in order to sufficiently suppress proton decay. On the other hand, the $\ \mu\$ is typically of order $\ 100\ \mathrm{GeV}\$ in order to be consistent with observations. Looking at the above equation it becomes clear that one has to be very precise in choosing the parameters $\ a\$ and $\ b\ :$ any two random parameters will not do, since then $\ \mu\$ and $\ m_\mathrm{T}\$ could be of the same order!

This is known as the doublet–triplet (DT) splitting problem: In order to be consistent we have to 'split' the 'masses' of $\ T\$ and $\ H\ ,$ but for that we need to fine-tune $\ a\$ and $\ b ~.$There are however some solutions to this problem (see e.g.) which can work quite well in SUSY models.

A review of the DT splitting problem can be found in.

=== Neutrino masses ===
As the SM the original Georgi–Glashow model proposed in does not include neutrino masses. However, since neutrino oscillation has been observed such masses are required. The solutions to this problem follow the same ideas which have been applied to the SM: One on hand on can include a $SU(5)$ singulet which then can generate either Dirac masses or Majorana masses. As in the SM one can also implement the type-I seesaw mechanism which then generates naturally light masses.

On the other hand, one can just parametrize the ignorance about neutrinos using the dimension 5 Weinberg operator:

$$\mathcal{O}_{W}=(\overline{\mathbf{5}}_F \mathbf{5}_H)\frac{Y_\nu}{\Lambda}(\overline{\mathbf{5}}_F \mathbf{5}_H)+h.c.$$

with $Y_\nu$ the $3\times 3$ Yukawa matrix required for the mixing between flavours.
