= Grand unification energy =

Energy level in particle physics

The grand unification energy $\Lambda_{GUT}$, or the GUT scale, is the energy level above which, it is believed, the electromagnetic force, weak force, and strong force become equal in strength and unify to one force governed by a simple Lie group. The exact value of the grand unification energy (if grand unification is indeed realized in nature) depends on the precise physics present at shorter distance scales not yet explored by experiments. If one assumes the Desert and supersymmetry, it is at around 10^{25} eV or 10^{16} GeV (≈ 1.6 megajoules).

Some Grand Unified Theories (GUTs) can predict the grand unification energy but, usually, with large uncertainties due to model dependent details such as the choice of the gauge group, the Higgs sector, the matter content or further free parameters. Furthermore, at the moment it seems fair to state that there is no agreed minimal GUT.

The unification of the electroweak force and the strong force with the gravitational force in a so-called "Theory of Everything" requires an even higher energy level which is generally assumed to be close to the Planck scale of 10^{19} GeV. In theory, at such short distances, gravity becomes comparable in strength to the other three forces of nature known to date. This statement is modified if there exist additional dimensions of space at intermediate scales. In this case, the strength of gravitational interactions increases faster at smaller distances and the energy scale at which all known forces of nature unify can be considerably lower. This effect is exploited in models of large extra dimensions.

The most powerful collider to date, the Large Hadron Collider (LHC), is designed to reach about 10^{4} GeV in proton–proton collisions. The scale 10^{16} GeV is only a few orders of magnitude below the Planck energy of 10^{19} GeV, and thus not within reach of human-made earth bound colliders.

== See also ==
- Desert (particle physics)
- Standard Model
- Timeline of the Big Bang
