= Generation (particle physics) =

Division of elementary particles

In particle physics, a generation or family is a division of the elementary particles. Between generations, particles differ by their flavour quantum number and mass, but their electric and strong interactions are identical.

There are three generations according to the Standard Model of particle physics. Each generation contains two types of leptons and two types of quarks. The two leptons may be classified into one with electric charge −1 (electron-like) and neutral (neutrino); the two quarks may be classified into one with charge −1/3 (down-type) and one with charge +2/3 (up-type). The basic features of quark–lepton generation or families, such as their masses and mixings etc., can be described by some of the proposed family symmetries.

Generations of matter
| Fermion categories | | Elementary particle generation | | |
| Type | Subtype | First | Second | Third |
|---|---|---|---|---|
| Quarks (colored) | down-type | down | strange | bottom |
| Quarks (colored) | up-type | up | charm | top |
| Leptons (color-free) | charged | electron | muon | tau |
| Leptons (color-free) | neutral | electron neutrino | muon neutrino | tau neutrino |

== Overview ==
Each member of a higher generation has greater mass than the corresponding particle of the previous generation, with the possible exception of the neutrinos (whose small but non-zero masses have not been accurately determined). For example, the first-generation electron has a mass of only 0.511 MeV/c^{2}, the second-generation muon has a mass of 106 MeV/c^{2}, and the third-generation tau has a mass of 1777 MeV/c^{2} (almost twice as massive as the proton). This mass hierarchy causes particles of higher generations to decay to the first generation, which explains why everyday matter (atoms) is made of particles from the first generation only. Electrons surround a nucleus made of protons and neutrons, which contain up and down quarks. The second and third generations of charged particles do not occur in normal matter and are only seen in extremely high-energy environments such as cosmic rays or particle accelerators. The term generation was first introduced by Haim Harari in Les Houches Summer School, 1976.

Neutrinos of all generations stream throughout the universe but rarely interact with other matter. It is hoped that a comprehensive understanding of the relationship between the generations of the leptons may eventually explain the ratio of masses of the fundamental particles, and shed further light on the nature of mass generally, from a quantum perspective.

== Fourth generation ==
Fourth and further generations are considered unlikely by many (but not all) theoretical physicists. Some arguments against the possibility of a fourth generation are based on the subtle modifications of precision electroweak observables that extra generations would induce; such modifications are strongly disfavored by measurements. There are functions used to generalize terms for introduction in a new quark that is an isosinglet and is responsible for generating Flavour-Changing-Neutral-Currents' (FCNC) at tree level in the electroweak sectors.

Nonetheless, searches at high-energy colliders for particles from a fourth generation continue, but as yet no evidence has been observed. In such searches, fourth-generation particles are denoted by the same symbols as third-generation ones with an added prime (e.g. b′ and t′).

A fourth generation with a 'light' neutrino (one with a mass less than about 45 GeV/c^{2}) was ruled out by measurements of the decay widths of the Z boson at CERN's Large Electron–Positron Collider (LEP) as early as 1989. The lower bound for a fourth generation neutrino (ν'_{τ}) mass as of 2010 was at about 60 GeV (millions of times larger than the upper bound for the other 3 neutrino masses). As of 2026, no evidence of a fourth-generation neutrino has ever been observed in neutrino oscillation studies either. Because even in the third generation (tau) neutrino ν_{τ}, mass is extremely small (making ν_{τ} the only third-generation particle that will not readily decay outside highly energetic conditions), a fourth-generation neutrino ν'_{τ} that observes the general rules for the known 3 neutrino generations should both be easily within current particle accelerators' energy levels, and occur during the regular and highly predictable switching-of-generations (oscillation) neutrinos perform.

If the Koide formula continues to hold, the masses of the fourth generation charged lepton would be 44 GeV (ruled out) and b′ and t′ should be 3.6 TeV and 84 TeV respectively (The maximum possible energy for protons in the LHC is about 6 TeV). The lower bound for a fourth generation of quark (b′, t′) masses as of 2019 was at 1.4 TeV from experiments at the LHC. The lower bound for a fourth generation charged lepton (τ') mass in 2012 was 100 GeV, with a proposed upper bound of 1.2 TeV from unitarity considerations.

== Origin ==
Unsolved problem in physics
Why are there three generations of quarks and leptons? Is there a theory that can explain the masses of particular quarks and leptons in particular generations from first principles (a theory of Yukawa couplings)?
More unsolved problems in physics

The origin of multiple generations of fermions, and the particular count of 3, is an unsolved problem of physics. String theory provides a cause for multiple generations, but the particular number depends on the details of the compactification of the D-brane intersections. Additionally, E_{8} grand unified theories in 10 dimensions compactified on certain orbifolds down to 4 D naturally contain 3 generations of matter. This includes many heterotic string theory models.

In standard quantum field theory, under certain assumptions, a single fermion field can give rise to multiple fermion poles with mass ratios of around e^{π} ≈ 23 and e^{2π} ≈ 535 potentially explaining the large ratios of fermion masses between successive generations and their origin.

The existence of precisely three generations with the correct structure was at least tentatively derived from first principles through a connection with gravity. The result implies a unification of gauge forces into SU(5). The question regarding the masses is unsolved, but this is a logically separate question, related to the Higgs sector of the theory.

== See also ==
- Grand Unified Theory
- Koide formula
- Neutrino mass hierarchy
