= Majoron =

Hypothetical Goldstone boson

- Composition: Elementary particle
- Statistics: Bosonic
- Family: Goldstone boson
- Status: Hypothetical
- Symbol: J
- Theorized: Y. Chikashige, R. N. Mohapatra, and R. D. Peccei
- Mass: unknown
- Electric charge: 0 e
- Spin: 0

In particle physics, majorons (named after Ettore Majorana) are a hypothetical type of Goldstone boson that are conjectured to mediate the neutrino mass violation of lepton number or B − L in certain high energy collisions such as

e^{−} + e^{−} → W^{−} + W^{−} + J

Where two electrons collide to form two W bosons and the majoron J. The U(1)_{B−L} symmetry is assumed to be global so that the majoron is not "eaten up" by the gauge boson and spontaneously broken. Majorons were originally formulated in four dimensions by Yuichi Chikashige, Rabindra Mohapatra and Roberto Peccei to understand neutrino masses by the seesaw mechanism and are being searched for in the neutrino-less double beta decay process. The name majoron was suggested by Graciela Gelmini as a derivative of the last name Majorana with the suffix -on typical of particle names like electron, proton, neutron, etc. There are theoretical extensions of this idea into supersymmetric theories and theories involving extra compactified dimensions. By propagating through the extra spatial dimensions the detectable number of majoron creation events vary accordingly. Mathematically, majorons may be modeled by allowing them to propagate through a material while all other Standard Model forces are fixed to an orbifold point.

== Searches ==
Experiments studying double beta decay have set limits on decay modes that emit majorons.

NEMO has observed a variety of elements. EXO and Kamland-Zen have set half-life limits for majoron decays in xenon.

== See also ==
- List of hypothetical particles
