= Firewoman (disambiguation) =

A firewoman is a female firefighter.

Firewoman or Firewomen may also refer to:

- Women in firefighting
- West Michigan Firewomen, women's soccer team
- "Fire Woman", 1989 song by The Cult
- Firewoman (Exhuma Exhortation), 1996 song from the album Trip/Reset
- Agnikanya (lit. 'Firewoman'), nickname of Indian politician Mamata Banerjee

== See also ==
- Woman of Fire, 1971 Korean film
- Woman of Fire '82, 1982 Korean film
- A Woman on Fire, 1969 Italian film
- Fireman (disambiguation)
- Firefighter (disambiguation)
- Fire Fighters (disambiguation)
