= Waste Isolation Pilot Plant =

Deep geological repository for radioactive waste

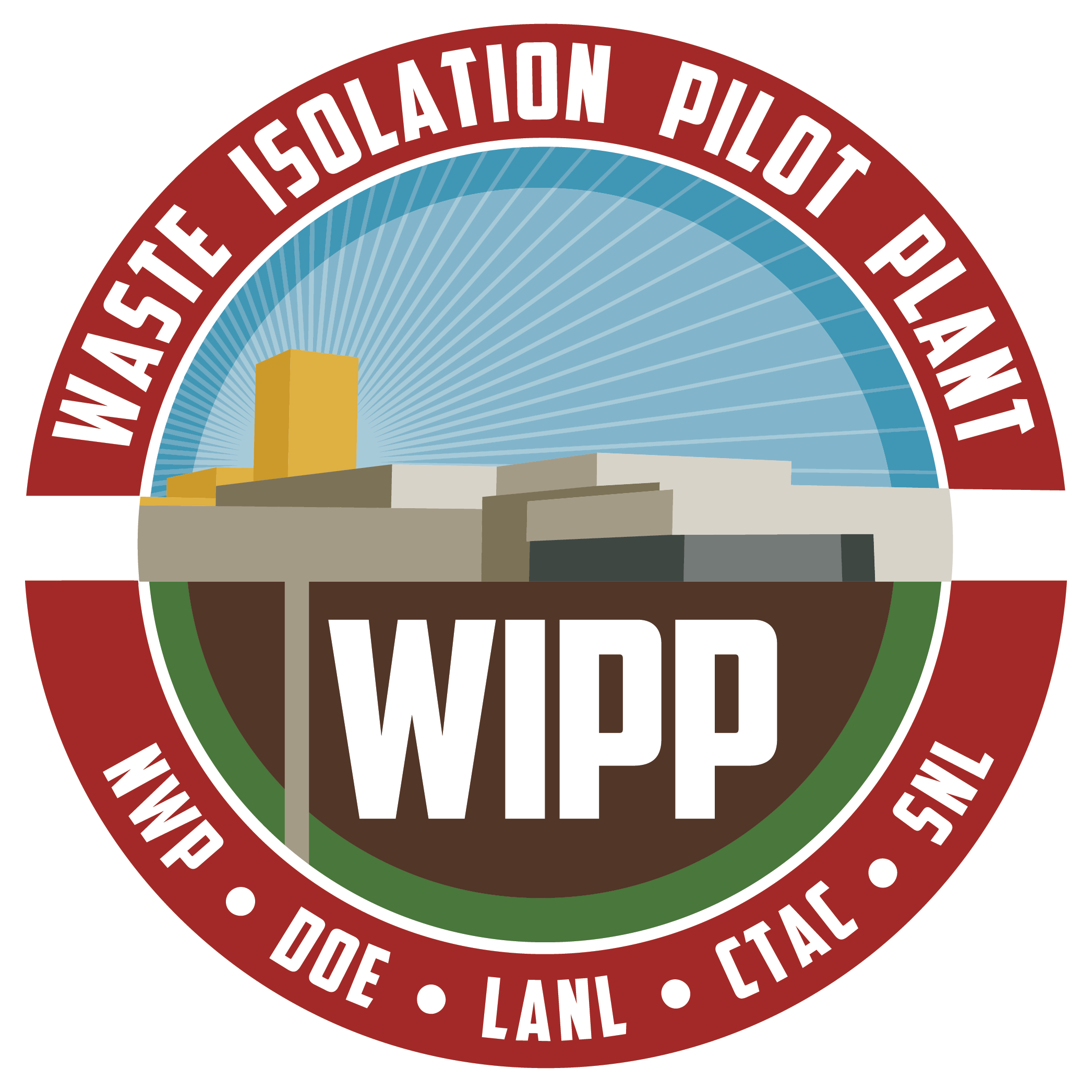
- Seal of the Waste Isolation Pilot Plant

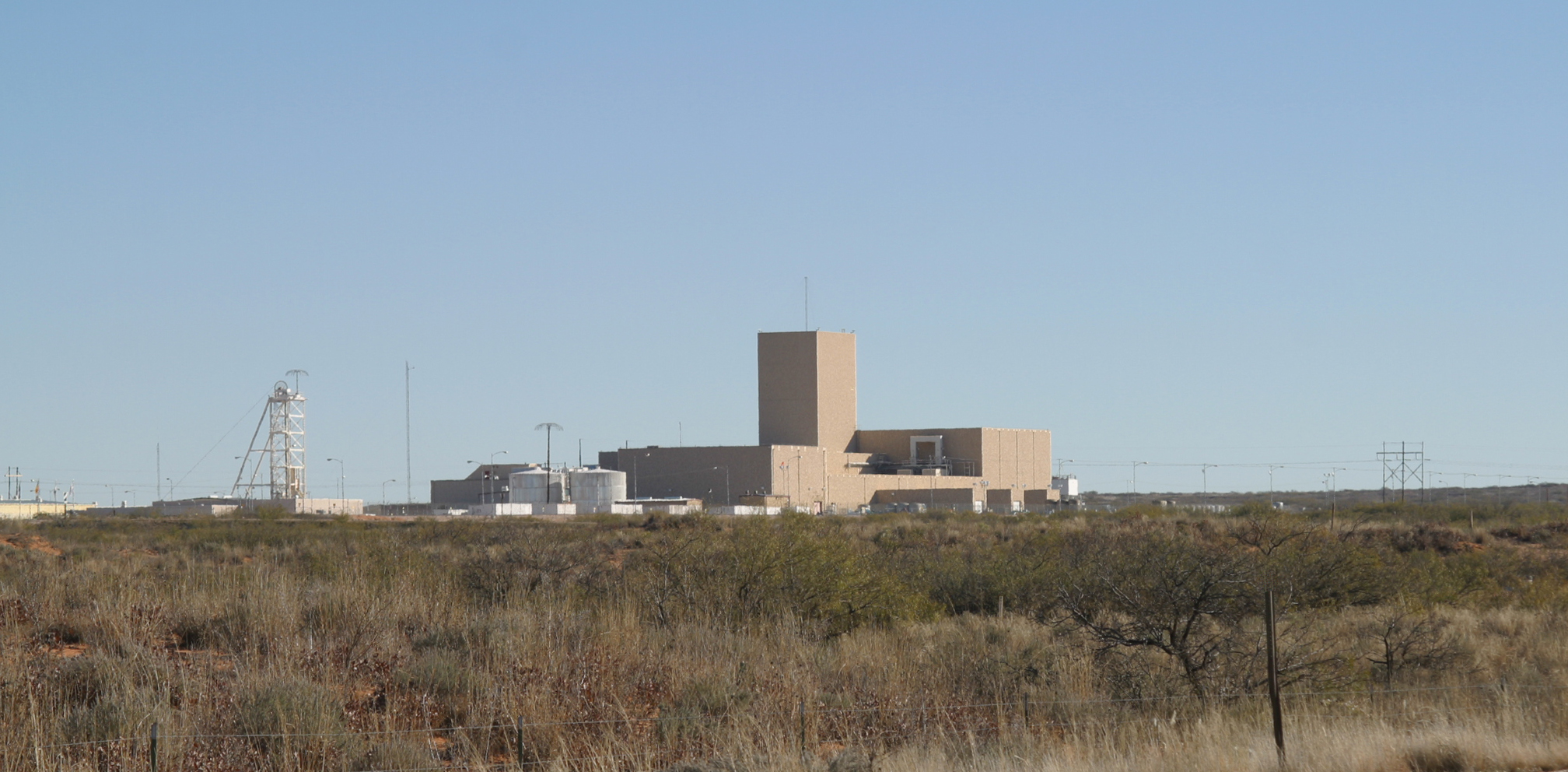
- WIPP, a geological repository for radioactive waste

- Location within New Mexico Location within the United States

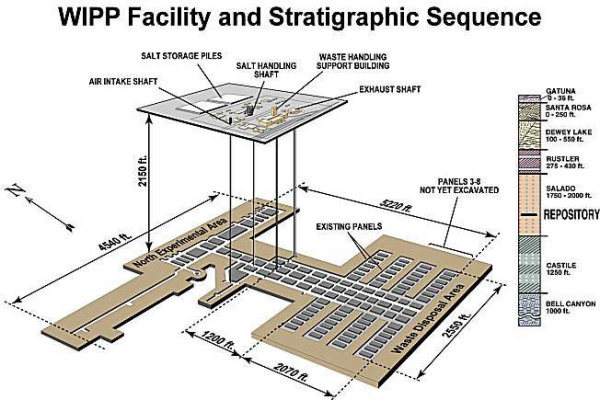

General information
- Type: WIPP
- Location: 26 mi (42 km) east of Pecos River, United States
- Coordinates: 32°22′18″N 103°47′37″W
- Opened: March 26, 1999

Website
- DOE: Waste Isolation Pilot Plant

The Waste Isolation Pilot Plant, or WIPP, in New Mexico, US, is a deep geological repository licensed to store transuranic radioactive waste for 10,000 years. The storage rooms at the WIPP are 2,150 feet (660 m) underground in a salt formation of the Delaware Basin. The waste is from the research and production of United States nuclear weapons only. The plant started operation in 1999, and the project is estimated to cost $19 billion in total. It is the world's third such facility, after Germany's Morsleben radioactive waste repository and the Schacht Asse II salt mine.

WIPP is located approximately 26 miles (42 km) east of Carlsbad, in eastern Eddy County, in an area known as the southeastern New Mexico nuclear corridor, which also includes the National Enrichment Facility near Eunice, New Mexico, the Waste Control Specialists low-level waste disposal facility just over the state line near Andrews, Texas, and the International Isotopes, Incorporated facility to be built near Eunice.

Various mishaps at the plant in 2014 brought focus to the problem of what to do with the growing backlog of waste and whether or not WIPP would be a safe repository. The 2014 incidents involved a waste explosion and airborne release of radiological material that exposed 21 plant workers to small doses of radiation that were within safety limits.

== History ==
=== Geology and site selection ===
In 1970, the United States Atomic Energy Commission, later merged into the Department of Energy (DOE), proposed a site in Lyons, Kansas for the isolation and storage of radioactive waste. Ultimately the Lyons site was deemed unusable due to local and regional opposition, and in particular the discovery of unmapped oil and gas wells located in the area. These wells were believed to potentially compromise the ability of the planned facility to contain nuclear waste. In 1973, as a result of these concerns, and because of positive interest from the southern New Mexico community, the DOE relocated the site of the proposed nuclear waste repository, now called the Waste Isolation Pilot Plant (WIPP), to the Delaware Basin salt beds located near Carlsbad, New Mexico.

The Delaware Basin is a sedimentary basin formed largely during the Permian Period approximately 250 million years ago. It is one of three sub-basins of the Permian Basin in West Texas and Southeastern New Mexico. It contains a 4,900–9,200 ft (1,500–2,800 m) thick column of sedimentary rock that includes some of the most oil- and gas-rich rocks in the United States. An ancient shallow sea repeatedly filled the basin and evaporated while the basin slowly subsided, leaving behind a nearly impermeable 3,300-foot-thick (1,000 m) layer of evaporites, primarily salt, in the Salado and Castile Formations, geologically similar to other basins created by evaporitic inland seas. Over time, the salt beds were covered by an additional 980 ft (300 m) of soil and rock. As drilling in the Salado Formation salt beds began in 1975, scientists discovered that at the edge of the basin there had been geological disturbances that had moved interbed layers into a nearly vertical position. In response, the site was moved toward the more stable center of the basin where the Salado Formation salt beds are the thickest and are perfectly horizontal.

Some observers suggested, early in the investigations, that the geological complexity of the basin was problematic, causing the hollowed-out caverns to be unstable. However, what is considered by some to be instability is considered by others to be a positive aspect of salt as a host rock. As early as 1957, the National Academy of Sciences recommended salt for radioactive waste disposal because at depth it would plastically deform, a motion called "salt creep" in the salt-mining industry. This would gradually fill in and seal any openings created by the mining, and in and around the waste.

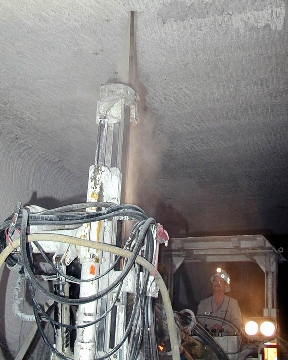
Installing supports in waste disposal rooms to keep them stable until filled

Exact placement of the construction site in the Delaware Basin changed multiple times due to safety concerns. Brine deposits located below the salt deposits in the Delaware Basin posed a potential safety problem. The brine was first discovered when a 1975 drilling released a pressurized deposit of the liquid from below the repository level. Constructing the plant near one of these deposits could, under specific circumstances, compromise the facility's safety. The brine could leak into the repository and either dissolve radioactivity or entrain particulate matter with radioactive waste to the surface. The contaminated brine would then need to be cleaned and properly disposed of. There is no drinking water near the site, so possible water pollution is not a concern. After deep drilling multiple times, a final site was selected. The site is located approximately 25 mi (40 km) east of Carlsbad.

Waste is placed in rooms 2,150 feet (660 m) underground that have been excavated within a 3,000-foot (910 m) thick salt formation (Salado and Castile Formations) where salt tectonics have been stable for more than 250 million years. Because of plasticity effects, salt will flow to any cracks that develop, a major reason why the area was chosen as a host medium for the WIPP project.

As of March 2022, the WIPP has received 40% of the authorized amount of waste set by the Land Withdrawal Act. More rooms and panels are to be added to accommodate more waste.

=== Addressing public concerns via the EEG ===
In order to address growing public unrest concerning construction of the WIPP, the New Mexico Environmental Evaluation Group (EEG) was created in 1978. This group, charged with overseeing the WIPP, verified statements, facts, and studies conducted and released by the DOE regarding the facility. The stewardship this group provided effectively lowered public fear and let the facility progress with little public opposition in comparison to similar facilities around the nation such as Yucca Mountain in Nevada.

The EEG, in addition to acting as a check for the government agencies overseeing the project, acted as a valuable advisor. In a 1981 drilling, pressurized brine was again discovered. The site was set to be abandoned when the EEG stepped in and suggested a series of tests on the brine and the surrounding area. These tests were conducted and the results showed that the brine deposit was relatively small and was isolated from other deposits. Drilling in the area was deemed safe due to these results. This saved the project valuable money and time by preventing a drastic relocation.

=== Early construction and testing complications ===
In 1979, the U.S. Congress authorized construction of the facility. In addition to formal authorization, Congress redefined the level of waste to be stored in the WIPP from high temperature to transuranic, or low level, waste. Transuranic waste often consists of materials which have come in contact with radioactive substances such as plutonium and uranium. This often includes gloves, tools, rags, and assorted machinery often used in the production of nuclear fuel and weapons. Although much less potent than nuclear reactor byproducts, this waste still remains radioactive for approximately 24,000 years. This change in classification led to a decrease in safety parameters for the proposed facility, allowing construction to continue at a faster pace.

The first extensive testing of the facility was due to begin in 1988. The proposed testing procedures involved interring samples of low level waste in the newly constructed caverns. Various structural and environmental tests would then be performed on the facility to verify its integrity and to prove its ability to safely contain nuclear waste. Opposition from various external organizations delayed actual testing into the early 1990s. Attempts at testing were resumed in October 1991 with US Secretary of Energy James Watkins announcing that he would begin transportation of waste to the WIPP.

Despite apparent progress on the facility, construction still remained costly and complicated. Originally conceptualized in the 1970s as a warehouse for waste, the repository now had regulations similar to those of nuclear reactors. As of December 1991, the plant had been under construction for 20 years and was estimated to have cost over one billion dollars (equivalent to $2.05 billion in 2024 dollars). At the time, WIPP officials reported over 28 different organizations claimed authority over operations of the facility.

=== Congressional approval ===
In November 1991, a federal judge ruled that Congress must approve WIPP before any waste, even for testing purposes, was sent to the facility. This indefinitely delayed testing until Congress gave its approval. The 102nd United States Congress passed legislation allowing use of the WIPP. The U.S. House of Representatives approved the facility on October 6, 1992, and the U.S. Senate passed a bill allowing the opening of the facility on October 8 of the same year. The bill was met with much opposition in the Senate. Senator Richard H. Bryan fought the bill based on safety issues that concerned a similar facility located in Nevada, the state for which he was serving as senator. His efforts almost prevented the bill from passing. New Mexico senators Pete V. Domenici and Jeff Bingaman effectively reassured Senator Bryan that these issues would be addressed in the 103rd Congress. The final legislation provided safety standards requested by the House of Representatives and an expedited timeline requested by the Senate.

The final legislation mandated that the Environmental Protection Agency (EPA) issue revised safety standards for the facility. It also required the EPA to approve testing plans for the facility within ten months. The legislation stated that the security standards mandated in the bill were only applicable to the WIPP in New Mexico and not to other facilities in the United States. This clause caused Senator Bryan to oppose the bill, as he wanted safety standards mandated by the bill to apply to the facility in Nevada as well.

=== Testing and final certification ===
In 1994, Congress ordered Sandia National Laboratories to begin an extensive evaluation of the facility against the standards set forth by the EPA. Evaluation of the facility continued for four years, resulting in a cumulative total of 25 years of evaluation. In May 1998, the EPA concluded that there was "reasonable expectation" that the facility would contain the vast majority of the waste interred there.

The first nuclear waste arrived to the plant on March 26, 1999. This waste shipment was from Los Alamos National Laboratory, a major nuclear weapons research and development facility located north of Albuquerque, New Mexico. Another shipment followed on April 6 of the same year. These shipments marked the beginning of plant operations. As of December 2010, the plant had received and stored 9,207 shipments (2,703,700 cu ft or 76,561 m^{3}) of waste. The majority of this waste was transported to the facility via railroad or truck. The final facility contains a total of 56 storage rooms located approximately 2,130 ft (650 m) underground. Each room is 300 ft (90 m) in length. The plant is estimated to continue accepting waste for 25 to 35 years and is estimated to cost a grand total of 19 billion dollars.

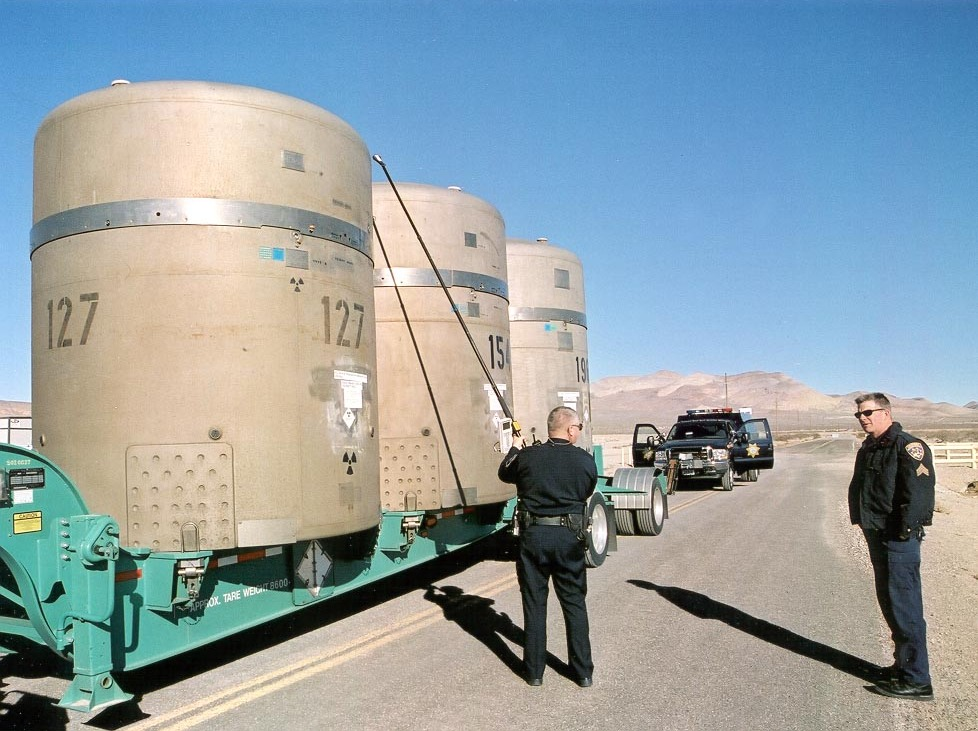
Shipment of casks arriving at the WIPP

=== Incidents at the WIPP ===
On February 5, 2014, at around 11:00 a.m., a salt haul truck caught fire, prompting an evacuation of the underground facility. Six workers were taken to a local hospital with smoke inhalation and were released by the next day. Lab tests after the fire confirmed that there was zero release of radiological material during, or as a result of, the fire. Underground air-monitoring equipment was out of commission after the truck fire.

In 2020, a subcontractor at the WIPP opened a $32 million lawsuit claiming that "the company that runs the facility breached its contract to rebuild the nuclear waste repository's air system." Due to the 2014 incident, a Texas-based company named Critical Application Alliance LLC was hired to build a new ventilation system. The project was going to fix the flawed design in roof panels, the foundation of the WIPP, and a highly defective control system design.

==== 2014 container explosion ====
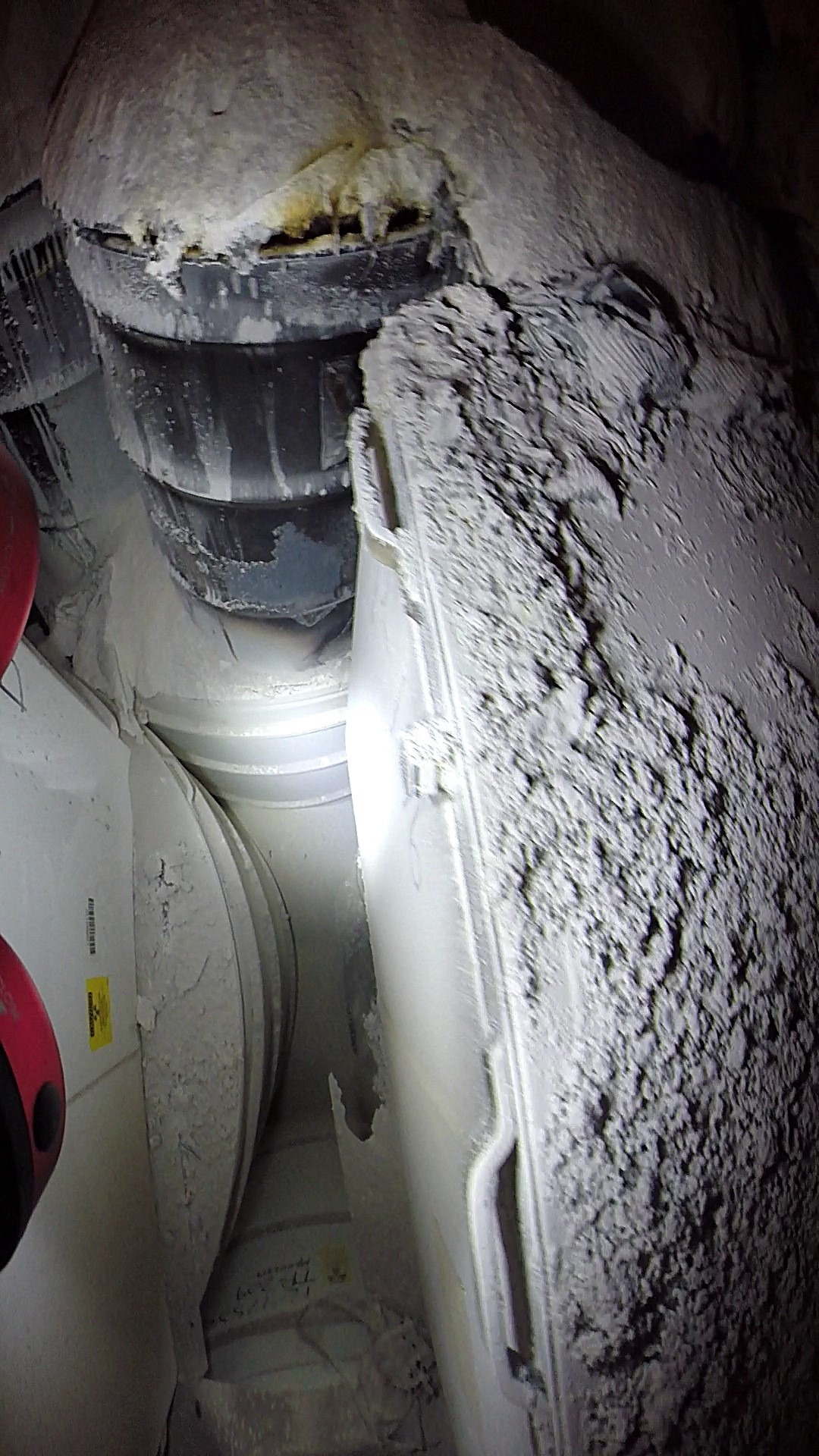
On February 14, 2014, radioactive materials leaked from a damaged storage drum. Analysis of accidents at the WIPP, by the DOE, have shown lack of a "safety culture" at the facility.

On February 15, 2014, authorities ordered workers to shelter in place at the facility after air monitors had detected unusually high radiation levels at 11:30 p.m. the previous day. None of the facility's 139 workers were underground at the time of the incident. Later, trace amounts of airborne radiation consisting of americium and plutonium particles were discovered above ground, 0.5 mi (0.80 km) from the facility. In total, 22 workers were exposed to radioactive contaminants equaling that of a standard chest x-ray. The Carlsbad Current-Argus wrote: "the radiation leak occurred on the evening of February 14, according to new information made public at a news conference [on February 20]. Joe Franco, manager of the DOE Carlsbad Field Office, said an underground air monitor detected high levels of alpha and beta radiation activity consistent [with] the waste buried at WIPP." Regarding the elevated levels of plutonium and americium detected outside the nuclear waste repository, Ryan Flynn, New Mexico Environment Secretary stated during a news conference: "Events like this simply should never occur. From the state's perspective, one event is far too many."

On February 26, 2014, the DOE announced that 13 WIPP above-ground workers had tested positive for exposure to radioactive material. Other employees were in the process of being tested. On Thursday, February 27, DOE announced that it sent out "a letter to tell people in two counties what they do know so far. Officials said it is too early to know what that means for the workers' health." Additional testing would be done on employees who were working at the site the day after the leak. Above ground, 182 employees continued to work. A February 27 update included comments on plans to first discover what occurred below ground using unmanned probes, then with people.

The Southwest Research and Information Center released a report on April 15, 2014 that one or more of 258 contact-handled radioactive waste containers located in room 7, panel 7 of the underground repository released radioactive and toxic chemicals. The location of the leak was estimated to be approximately 1,500 feet (460 m) from the air monitor that triggered the contaminants in the filtration system. The contaminants were spread through more than 3,000 feet (910 m) of tunnels, leading to the 2,150-foot (660 m) exhaust shaft into the surrounding above-ground environment. Air-monitoring station #107, located 0.5 miles (0.8 km) away, detected the radiotoxins. The filter from station #107 was analyzed by the Carlsbad Environmental Monitoring and Research Center (CEMRC) and found to contain 0.64 becquerels (Bq) per cubic meter of air of americium-241 and 0.014 Bq of plutonium-239 and plutonium-240 per cubic meter of air (equivalent to 0.64 and 0.014 radioactive decay events per second per cubic meter of air). The DOE agreed that there was a release of radioactivity from the repository and confirmed that "The event took place starting at 14 February 2014 at 23:14 and continued to 15 February 2014 14:45." The DOE also confirmed that "A large shift in wind direction can be seen to occur around 8:30 AM on 2/15/14." The EPA reported on the radiological release on their WIPP News page.

After analysis by CEMRC, the station A filter was found on February 15, 2014, to be contaminated with 4,335.71 Bq of Am-241 per every cubic meter, and 671.61 Bq of plutonium-239 and plutonium-240 per every cubic meter. Bob Alvarez, former DOE official, stated that the long-term ramifications of the WIPP issue are grounded in the fact that the DOE has 66,000 m^{3} (2,300,000 cu ft) of transuranic waste that has not been disposed of due to the fact that there are no long-term disposition plans for transuranic waste, including 5 tons of plutonium that are in-situ at the Savannah River Site, as well as water from the Hanford Nuclear Reservation in Washington State. In an article in the Bulletin of the Atomic Scientists, Alvarez wrote that "Wastes containing plutonium blew through the WIPP ventilation system, traveling 2,150 feet to the surface, contaminating at least 17 workers, and spreading small amounts of radioactive material into the environment." The URS Corporation, who oversees WIPP, removed and demoted the contracted manager of the repository. Alvarez ponders the notion of "contract handling" of radioactive waste because it deploys conventional processing practices that do not account for the tens of thousands of containers buried before 1970 at several DOE sites. Alvarez states that the quantity of this pre-1970 plutonium waste is 1,300 times more than the amount permitted to "leak" into the environment at WIPP; however, much of this waste is simply buried a few feet underground at DOE sites.

The source of contamination was later found to be a barrel that exploded on February 14 because contractors at Los Alamos National Laboratory packed it with organic cat litter instead of clay cat litter. Other barrels with the same problem were then sealed in larger containers. Anthropologist Vincent Ialenti has examined the political, social, and financial triggers to this organic cat litter error in detail, linking it to the accelerated pace of the Department of Energy's and State of New Mexico's 3706 nuclear waste cleanup campaign, which ran from 2011 to 2014. Ialenti's study was published in The Bulletin of the Atomic Scientists in July 2018.

The 2014 incidents raised the question of whether WIPP would be a safe replacement for the Yucca Mountain nuclear waste repository in Nevada as the destination for all waste generated at U.S. commercial nuclear power plants. The cost of the 2014 accident was initially expected to exceed $2 billion and disrupted other programs at various nuclear-industry sites. On January 9, 2017, the plant was formally reopened after three years of cleanup costing $500 million, which is significantly less than forecasted. On April 10, 2017, the plant received its first shipment of waste since reopening.

== Climate ==
The site of the Waste Isolation Pilot Plant is where the highest temperature ever recorded in New Mexico, 122 °F (50 °C), occurred during the summer of 1994.

Climate data for Waste Isolation Pilot Plant, New Mexico
Month	Jan	Feb	Mar	Apr	May	Jun	Jul	Aug	Sep	Oct	Nov	Dec	Year
Record high °F (°C)	82 (28)	89 (32)	93 (34)	102 (39)	109 (43)	122 (50)	113 (45)	115 (46)	113 (45)	100 (38)	88 (31)	82 (28)	122 (50)
Mean maximum °F (°C)	75.64 (24.24)	80.50 (26.94)	87.80 (31.00)	94.25 (34.58)	101.38 (38.54)	107.16 (41.76)	105.42 (40.79)	102.96 (39.42)	99.71 (37.62)	93.31 (34.06)	82.41 (28.01)	76.15 (24.53)	107.16 (41.76)
Mean daily maximum °F (°C)	60.1 (15.6)	64.7 (18.2)	73.1 (22.8)	81.7 (27.6)	89.9 (32.2)	97.7 (36.5)	96.9 (36.1)	95.2 (35.1)	89.0 (31.7)	80.9 (27.2)	68.5 (20.3)	60.4 (15.8)	79.8 (26.6)
Mean daily minimum °F (°C)	29.4 (−1.4)	33.2 (0.7)	39.2 (4.0)	47.4 (8.6)	56.8 (13.8)	65.7 (18.7)	69.0 (20.6)	67.9 (19.9)	60.7 (15.9)	49.6 (9.8)	37.1 (2.8)	29.4 (−1.4)	48.8 (9.3)
Mean minimum °F (°C)	15.86 (−8.97)	17.93 (−7.82)	21.30 (−5.94)	30.91 (−0.61)	40.74 (4.86)	55.73 (13.18)	62.15 (16.75)	59.81 (15.45)	48.36 (9.09)	33.48 (0.82)	20.24 (−6.53)	12.93 (−10.59)	12.0 (−11.1)
Record low °F (°C)	6 (−14)	−4 (−20)	6 (−14)	21 (−6)	24 (−4)	50 (10)	56 (13)	56 (13)	35 (2)	19 (−7)	12 (−11)	1 (−17)	−4 (−20)
Average precipitation inches (mm)	0.41 (10)	0.50 (13)	0.49 (12)	0.58 (15)	1.29 (33)	1.55 (39)	2.13 (54)	1.80 (46)	2.12 (54)	1.02 (26)	0.28 (7.1)	0.70 (18)	12.88 (327)
Source: Western Regional Climate Center

== Future ==
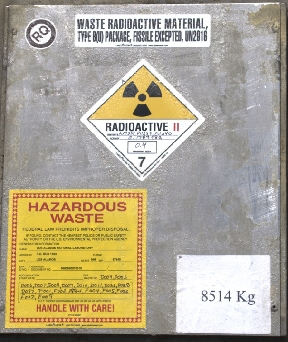
Warnings on a waste container

Following the interment of waste in the facility, estimated to be sometime between 2025 and 2035 the storage caverns will be collapsed and sealed with 13 layers of concrete and soil. Salt will then seep into and fill the various fissures and cracks surrounding the casks of waste. After approximately 75 years, the waste will be completely isolated from the environment.

== Yucca Mountain waste repository ==
The Yucca Mountain Nuclear Waste Repository is an unfinished, currently defunct deep geological repository in Nye County, Nevada. In 1987, Congress selected Yucca Mountain for research as the potential first permanent repository for nuclear waste and directed the Department of Energy (DOE) to disregard other proposed sites and study Yucca Mountain exclusively. However, federal funding for the site was terminated in 2011 by amendment to the Department of Defense and Full-Year Continuing Appropriations Act, passed on April 14, 2011.

== Criteria ==
Waste that is to be disposed of at WIPP must meet certain "waste acceptance criteria". It accepts transuranic waste generated from DOE activities. The waste must have radioactivity exceeding 100 nanocuries (3.7 kBq) per gram from TRUs that produce alpha radiation with a half-life greater than 20 years. This criterion includes plutonium, uranium, americium, and neptunium among others. The WIPP must not serve as a disposal site for any high-level radioactive waste or used nuclear fuel. Mixed waste contains both radioactive and hazardous constituents, and WIPP first received mixed waste on September 9, 2000. Mixed waste is jointly regulated by the EPA and the New Mexico Environment Department.

The containers may also contain a limited amount of liquids. The energy released from radioactive materials will dissociate water into hydrogen and oxygen (radiolysis). This could then create a potentially explosive environment inside the container. The containers must also be vented to prevent this. All containers must pass a documented visual inspection to ensure they are in good condition. "Good condition" is described as "not having significant rusting, is of sound and structural integrity, and does not show signs of leakage."

== Principle ==
Waste is placed in rooms 2,150 feet (660 m) underground that have been excavated within a 3,000-foot (910 m) thick salt formation (Salado and Castile Formations) where salt tectonics have been stable for more than 250 million years. Because of plasticity effects, salt and water will flow to any cracks that develop, a major reason why the area was chosen as a host medium for the WIPP project. Because drilling or excavation in the area will be hazardous long after the area is actively used, there are plans to construct markers to deter inadvertent human intrusion for the next ten thousand years.

The Salado Formation is a massive bedded salt deposit (>99% NaCl) that has a simple hydrogeology. Because massive NaCl is somewhat plastic, so holes close under pressure, the rock becomes non-porous by effectively closing pores and fractures. This has a significant effect on the overall hydraulic conductivities (water permeabilities) and molecular diffusion coefficients. These are on the order of ≤10^{−14} m/s and ≤10^{−15} m^{2}/s respectively.

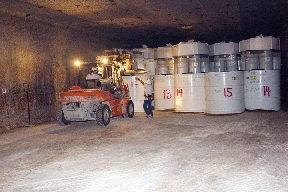
Storage of radioactive waste at WIPP

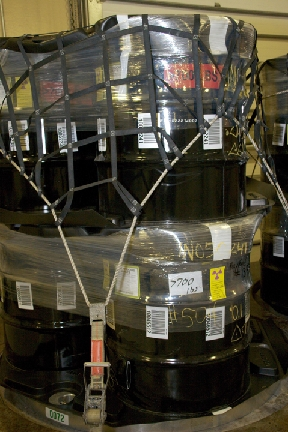
Labeled 100-gallon drums staged for downloading and emplacement in the repository

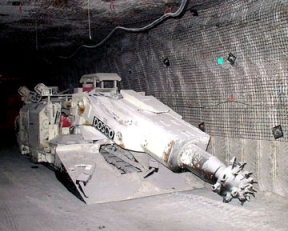
The DOSCO rotary head mining machine at WIPP

== Awareness triggers ==
2007 ISO radioactivity danger logo

Since 1983, the DOE has been working with linguists, archaeologists, anthropologists, materials scientists, science fiction writers, and futurists to come up with a warning system. For the case of the WIPP, the markers, called "passive institutional controls", will include an outer perimeter of thirty-two 25-foot-tall (7.6 m) granite pillars built in a four-mile (6 km) square. These pillars will surround an earthen wall, 33 feet (10 m) tall and 100 feet (30 m) wide. Enclosed within this wall will be another 16 granite pillars. At the center, directly above the waste site, will sit a roofless, 15-foot (4.6 m) granite room providing more information. The team intends to etch warnings and informational messages into the granite slabs and pillars.

This information will be recorded in the six official languages of the United Nations (English, Spanish, Russian, French, Chinese, Arabic) as well as the Native American Navajo language native to the region, with additional space for translation into future languages. Pictograms are also being considered, such as stick figure images and the iconic The Scream from Edvard Munch's painting. Complete details about the plant will not be stored on site; instead, they would be distributed to archives and libraries around the world. The team plans to submit their final plan to the U.S. Government by around 2028 and they will finalize the warning messages by 2033.

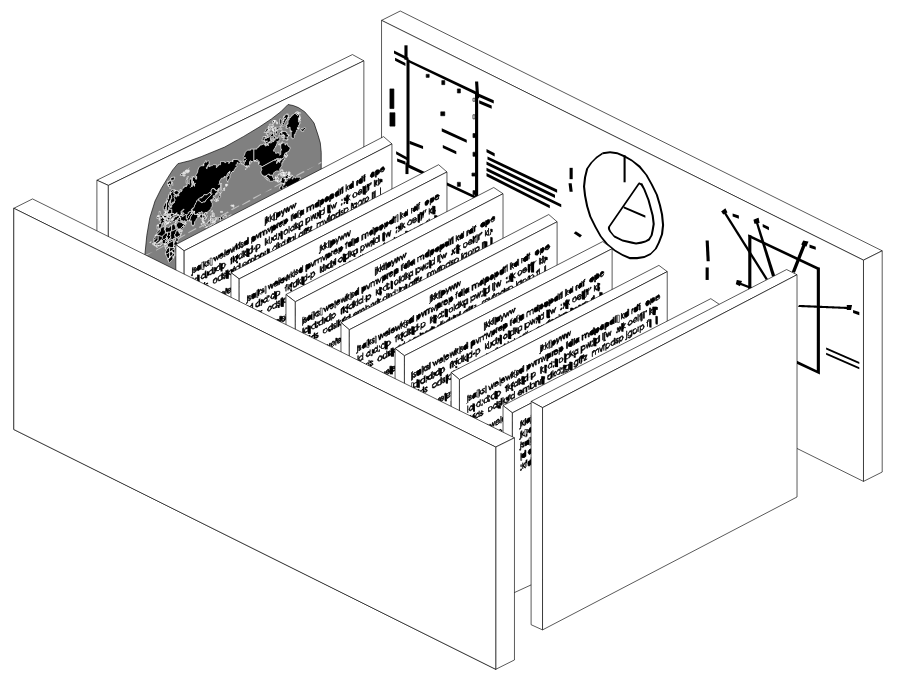
Design for the WIPP information room

A proposed notice for the markers outlining a 16 sq mi (41 km^{2}) exclusion area around the WIPP facility.

Proposed design for small disks that will be randomly scattered and buried within the controlled zone, to warn people digging that it is dangerous and they should stop.

A proposed notice for the markers on the actual site of the repository.

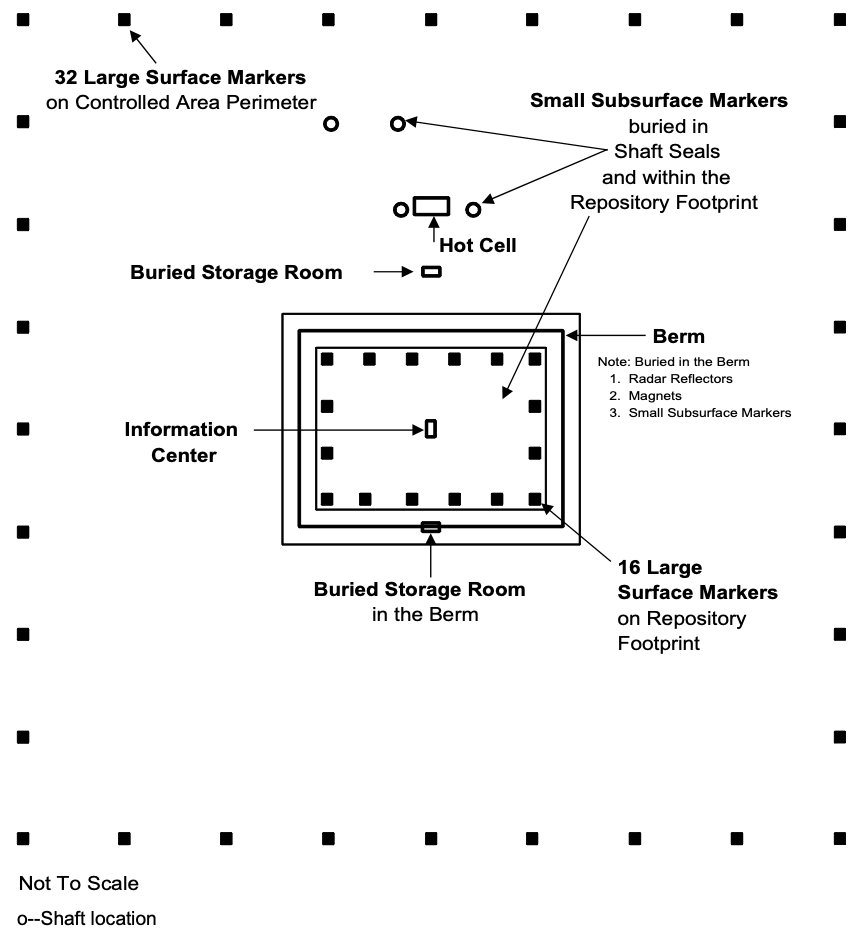
The conceptual design of warning markers at the WIPP site.

== Underground laboratory ==
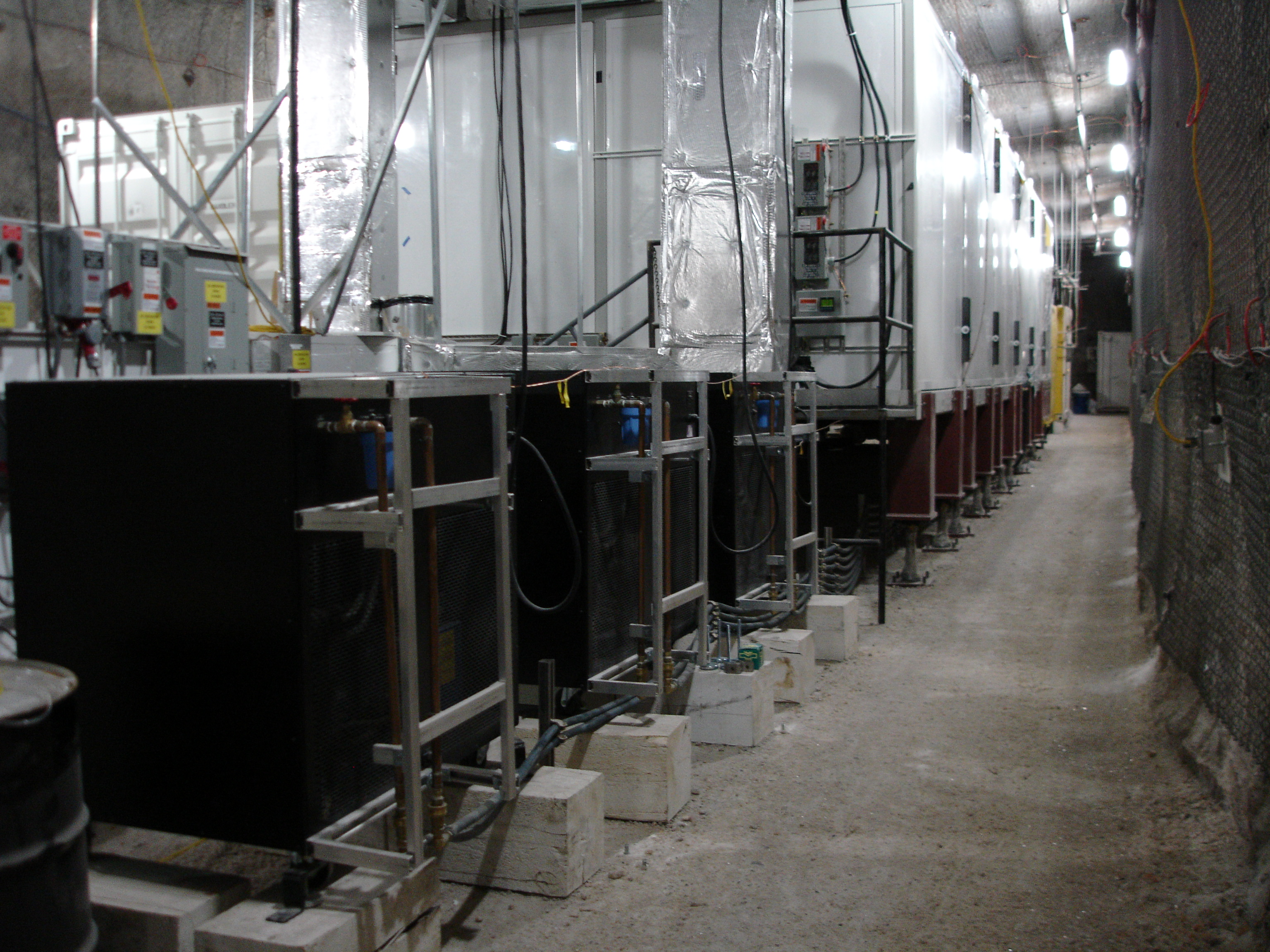
Cleanrooms for EXO installed in a tunnel at WIPP

A portion of the site is used to house underground physics experiments which require shielding from cosmic rays. Although only moderately deep as such laboratories go (1585 meter water equivalent shielding), the site has several advantages. The salt is easy to excavate, dry (no water to pump out), and salt is much lower in naturally occurring radionuclides than rock.

The WIPP plant suffered an accident in February 2014 that forced all scientific activities to cease; for most experiments, it took one to two years to recover, and not all experiments recovered to continue their activities in WIPP. Especially it is unknown whether the Dark Matter Time Projection Chamber collaboration recovered their operations in WIPP after the February 2014 events.

As of 2018, the WIPP houses the Enriched Xenon Observatory (EXO) searching for neutrinoless double beta decay. The dark matter experiment collaboration that operated in WIPP before 2014, Dark Matter Time Projection Chamber (DMTPC), is continuing their work and aims to deploy their next detector at SNOLAB. After the 2014 events at the WIPP, the DMTPC experiments were put on hold, but are expected to resume after the building is finished and waste is done being placed in the facility. The detector that the DMTPC collaboration had at WIPP was the 10-L DMTPC prototype detector (with active volume of 10 litres, hence the name 10-L or 10L) which started operations at WIPP October 2010.

Also the EXO collaboration is continuing their activities. The planned end of the EXO operations in WIPP was December 2018, and the collaboration was planning to have the next-stage detector built in SNOLAB. This means that the two biggest experimental infrastructures (EXO and DMTPC) of WIPP intend to relocate to SNOLAB and cease their operations in WIPP before the end of 2019. This would leave the WIPP underground laboratory without any major scientific experiment.

Previous experiments at WIPP include the neutrinoless double beta decay searching MAJORANA Project detectors called Segmented Enriched Germanium Assembly (SEGA) and Multiple Element Germanium Array (MEGA); these were prototype detectors used to develop the measurement apparatus of the collaboration that was deployed in 2004 in WIPP. Since then (2014 onwards), the MAJORANA collaboration has constructed a detector, the MAJORANA Demonstrator, at Sanford Underground Research Facility (SURF) at Lead, South Dakota. The MAJORANA collaboration remained active (as of 2019) and aimed to construct a large neutrinoless double beta decay experiment LEGEND after the MAJORANA Demonstrator phase.

Some smaller neutrino and dark matter experiments that have been mostly technology development oriented have also taken place at WIPP. There have also been a number of biology experiments in WIPP; for example, these experiments have studied the biological conditions of the deep under ground salt deposit. In one experiment, researchers were able to cultivate bacteria from 250 million year old spores found in WIPP. The Low Background Radiation Experiment studies the effects of reduced radiation environment to biological systems. The Low Background Radiation Experiment was stopped along with all other experiments in February 2014, but continued after summer 2016 at WIPP and has been ongoing since.

The 2000 testing of actinide transport within the Culebra Dolomite from the surrounding area of Carlsbad, New Mexico, was one of many experiments at this location to address concerns for lab safety. Other geology/geophysics experiments have taken place at WIPP, as have some special experiments relating to the operations of the Plant as a repository of radioactive waste.

== See also ==
- Onkalo spent nuclear fuel repository – Deep geological repository for radioactive waste in Finland
- Human Interference Task Force – Task Force convened on behalf of the U.S. Department of Energy
- Stored Waste Examination Pilot Plant – Radioactive waste management facility in Idaho, USA
- Yucca Mountain nuclear waste repository – Unused deep geological repository facility in Nevada, US
- Project Gnome – 1961 nuclear test explosion in New Mexico, United States
- List of nuclear waste treatment technologies – Unusable radioactive materials
