= Jennifer Thomas =

Jennifer Thomas may refer to:

- Jennifer Anne Thomas, British physicist
- Jennifer Thomas (pianist) (born 1977), American pianist
- Jennifer Thomas (wrestler) (born 1973), American wrestler
