= Jennifer Anne Thomas =

British physicist

Jenny Thomas CBE FRS FInstP
- Born: Jennifer Anne Thomas
- Education: University of London (BSc); University of Oxford (DPhil)
- Known for: Research into neutrino oscillations
- Scientific career
- Workplaces: DESY; CERN; Fermilab; University of Oxford; University College London; Max Planck Institute for Physics; Superconducting Super Collider; Neutrino Ettore Majorana Observatory
- Thesis: A study of semi-leptonic decays of heavy quarks (1983)
- Doctoral advisor: Michael G. Bowler
- Website: hep.ucl.ac.uk/~jthomas/

Jennifer Anne Thomas, CBE FRS FInstP, is a British experimental particle physicist and professor at University College London. She has been a pioneer in the development of particle detectors, and the recipient of the Michael Faraday medal and prize in 2018 for her "outstanding investigations into the physics of neutrino oscillations".

== Education ==
She earned a Bachelor of Science degree with honours from Bedford College, University of London, in 1981. She received her DPhil in particle physics from the University of Oxford in 1983 for research on semi-leptonic decays of heavy quarks supervised by Michael G. Bowler.

== Career and research ==
Thomas held a postdoctoral research position at Imperial College and Deutsches Elektronen-Synchrotron (DESY) in Hamburg from 1983 to 1985. She was a CERN fellow from 1985 to 1988 and worked there on the Time Projection Chamber (TPC) for the ALEPH experiment. She was a Wissenschaflicher Angestellter at the Max Planck Institute for Physics in Munich from 1988 to 1991. She then became a staff scientist at the Superconducting Super Collider Laboratory in Dallas, Texas.

In 1994, she returned to Oxford as a Research Officer on the MINOS proposed experiment, subsequently bringing that experiment to University College London in 1996, and leading the MINOS collaboration since 2010. She was instrumental in broadening the range of the experiment to search for the hypothetical sterile neutrinos.

As of 2020 her work centres around the physics of neutrinos. She is the co-spokesperson for the MINOS/MINOS+ experiment and is a member of the NEMO-III and SuperNEMO experiments, where she researched neutrinoless double beta decay and potential neutrino CP violation. Most recently, she is heavily involved in the development of the CHIPS experiment, an attempt to deliver a flexible and low-cost Cherenkov radiation-based neutrino detector in flooded mines at Fermilab.

== Awards and honours ==
Thomas was awarded a Commander of the Most Excellent Order of the British Empire in the 2011 Birthday Honours. She was elected a Fellow of the Royal Society (FRS) in 2017. She is also a Fellow of the Institute of Physics and the American Physical Society. She was the winner of the 2018 Institute of Physics Michael Faraday medal and prize.
