= Michael K. Moe =

American physicist

Michael K. Moe (born November 17, 1937 in Milwaukee) is an American experimental physicist, specializing in particle physics and nuclear physics. He is known his role in 1987 in the direct detection of two neutrino double beta decay in ^{82}Se. (Indirect detection of two neutrino double beta decay had been done in the 1960s.)

== Education and career ==
Moe received in 1959 his bachelor's degree from Stanford University and in 1965 his Ph.D. under Frederick Reines from Case Western Reserve University.

After spending a year as a post-doc at Caltech, Moe moved to the University of California, Irvine in 1966, where a preprint sent by C. S. Wu sparked his interest in double beta decay. He designed a TPC for double beta decay, and developed it with Steve Elliott and Alan Hahn to finally see the first solid evidence of two-neutrino decay in ^{82}Se in 1987. His group went on to measure this rare decay in ^{48}Ca, ^{100}Mo, and ^{150}Nd.

Moe became at the University of California, Irvine in 1966 an assistant research physicist, in 1968 an assistant professor, in 1973 a research physicist, and retiring in 1997.

He was also involved in the search for the extremely rare (and perhaps nonexistent) neutrino-less double beta decay, for which he published a proposal in 1991; in the 2000s he participated in the search for such decay pursued by SLAC's Enriched Xenon Observatory (EXO).

In 2013 Moe received the Tom W. Bonner Prize in Nuclear Physics.
