= Firefighter (disambiguation) =

Firefighter or fire fighter is a profession.

Firefighter or Fire Fighter(s) may also refer to:

== Transport and vehicular ==
- de Havilland Canada DHC-515 Firefighter, a flying boat scooping waterbomber, formerly (Canadair) Viking Air CL-515 Firefighter; a variant of the Bombardier (Canadair) CL-415 Super Scooper turboprop

=== Boats ===
- Fire Fighter (fireboat), a 1938 U.S. National Historic Landmark
- Fire Fighter II, a 2010 NYFD fire boat
- Firefighter (Wilmington fireboat), built for Wilmington, Delaware, by MetalCraft Marine, in 2012
- Firefighter I (Singapore), see Fireboats in Singapore
- Firefighter II (Singapore), see Fireboats in Singapore

== Arts, entertainment and media ==
=== Films ===
- Fire Fighters, a 1922 silent short film
- The Fire Fighters, a 1927 action film serial
- The Fire Fighters, a 1930 Mickey Mouse cartoon
- Firefighter, a 1986 American made-for-television drama film

=== Literature ===
- Firefighter! Daigo of Fire Company M (Japanese: め組の大吾, romanized: Megumi no Daigo), a 1995 shōnen manga by Masahito Soda

=== Music ===
- "Firefighter" (song), a 2024 song by Nutsa Buzaladze

=== Television ===
- "Firefighter" (Japanese: 消防官, romanized: Faiafaitā, lit. 'ファイアファイター'), the 2023 episode 2 of the Japanese anime TV show Firefighter Daigo: Rescuer in Orange (Japanese: め組の大吾 救国のオレンジ, romanized: Megumi no Daigo Kyūkoku no Orenji)

=== Video games ===
- Fire Fighter (video game), a 1982 action game
- Firefighter F.D.18, a 2004 action game

== Other uses ==
- The Firefighters, a Banana Ball Championship League team.

== See also ==
- List of firefighting museums
- Fireman (disambiguation)
- Firefight (disambiguation)
