= Large Enriched Germanium Experiment for Neutrinoless BB Decay =

Neutrinoless double beta decay experiment

The Large Enriched Germanium Experiment for Neutrinoless ββ Decay (LEGEND) is a physics experiment located at the Laboratori Nazionali del Gran Sasso (LNGS) in Italy. LEGEND is a phased experiment searching for neutrinoless double beta decay (0νββ) in ^{76}Ge. The LEGEND collaboration combines the expertise and technology of the MAJORANA and GERDA experiments, currently consisting of over 50 institutions from across the globe.

== Physics ==
Neutrinoless double beta decay, if observed, would offer several explanations to questions that extend physics beyond the Standard Model. The process would demonstrate the creation of matter without antimatter, which would contribute to theories concerning why the universe is matter dominated. Additionally, it would prove that neutrinos are Majorana particles, that is neutrinos are their own antiparticles.

== Design ==
=== LEGEND-200 ===
The first phase of the LEGEND experiment consists of up to 200kg of high-purity germanium detectors (HPGes) installed within the liquid argon cryostat originally used by the GERDA experiment.

The outermost layer of the experiment, consists of a water tank instrumented with photomultiplier tubes to tag muon events. Inside the water tank is the liquid argon cryostat, which cools the HPGes to their operating temperature and provides additional passive shielding. Additionally, as liquid argon is a scintillator, it allows for active background rejection. Light resulting from particle interactions in the liquid argon is readout using a system of wavelength-shifting fibers and silicone photomultipliers (SiPMs)

The germanium detectors used in LEGEND are or four geometric types: coaxial, p-type point contact (PPC), Broad Energy Germanium (BEGe), and inverted coaxial (IC). Within the cryostat, the detectors are arranged in vertical strings, the support material of which is optimized in order to reduce backgrounds. As in the predecessor experiment, the Majorana Demonstrator, underground electroformed copper is used due to its incredibly low level of background radioactive decays. Additional materials include the plastic polyethylene naphthalat (PEN), which is capable of scintillation. The light produced from background decays within the PEN, or from background particles interacting with the PEN and be detected and used to identify background events

The goal of the LEGEND-200 phase of the experiment is to search for 0νββ at half-lives T_{1/2} > 1×10^{27} years at 90% confidence level. This corresponds to an effective Majorana neutrino mass of mββ < 33–71 meV; the experiment plans to run for about five years.

=== LEGEND-1000 ===
The second phase of LEGEND, LEGEND-1000, would consist of up to 1000kg of HPGes enriched to over 90% in ^{76}Ge.. The goal of the second phase is to cover the entire parameter space for the inverted neutrino mass ordering, with T_{1/2} > 1×10^{28} years. To achieve this limit, LEGEND-1000 will reduce the backgrounds by a factor of 20, compared to LEGEND-200. New materials such as underground argon and lower radioactivity in cables and electronics will help achieve this goal

== Status ==
The first physics data run ran from March of 2023 to February 2024, during which a total exposure of 85.5kg yr was achieved.

=== Results ===
In September of 2025, the first result of the LEGEND experiment was released. In the first deployment, 142.5 kg of HPGe detectors were deployed. In a combined analysis with data from LEGEND, GERDA, and the Majorana Demonstrator, the collaboration reported a half-life limit of T_{1/2} > 1.9 × 10^{26} years (90% confidence level), which corresponds to an upper limit on the effective Majorana mass m_{ββ} < 75–200 meV.
