= Stored Waste Examination Pilot Plant =

Radioactive waste management facility in Idaho, USA

Coordinates: 43.498°N 113.039°W

The Stored Waste Examination Pilot Plant (SWEPP) is a facility at the Idaho National Laboratory for nondestructively examining containers of radioactive waste to determine if they meet criteria to be stored at the Waste Isolation Pilot Plant. SWEPP is part of the Radioactive Waste Management Complex, located southwest of EBR-I.
