= Fireman (disambiguation) =

A fireman is a firefighter. It may also be used restrictively to refer only to male firefighters.

Fireman or Firemen may also refer to:

== Basic meanings ==
- Fireman (steam engine), an individual employed to tend the fire for running a steam engine, either on a stationary engine, a railway locomotive or a steamship
- A United States Navy or United States Coast Guard rate for an enlisted seaman who works on ships' propulsion systems, even though steamships are no longer used

== Film ==
- The Fireman (1916 film), a Charlie Chaplin film
- The Fireman (1931 film), a short animated film distributed by Universal Pictures
- Fireman (film), a 2015 Malayalam film
- An individual employed to start fires to burn books in the novel and film Fahrenheit 451, also the title of the book as first published
- Fireman (TV series), a Japanese TV series known as Magma Man in some markets
- Fire Man (Mega Man), a Robot Master from the video game series Mega Man

== Music ==
- The Fireman, an alternative name used by Capleton, a Jamaican reggae artist
- The Fireman (band), an electronic music duo consisting of English musicians Paul McCartney and Youth
- Fireman (album), an album by hHead

=== Songs ===
- "Firemen", single by The Cravats 1982
- "The Fireman" (song), song by George Strait 1985
- "Fireman", single by Steve Kilbey 1987
- "Fireman", single by Jawbreaker 1995
- "Fireman" (song), from Lil Wayne's 2005 studio album Tha Carter II

== People with the surname ==
- Edward L. Fireman (1922–1990), American physicist
- Paul Fireman (born 1944), American businessman

== Other ==
- Fireman (baseball), a baseball player who enters the game after the starting pitcher is removed
- Fireman (peyote), a role within ceremonies of the Native American Church
- The Fireman (novel), a 2016 novel by Joe Hill
- The Fireman (Twin Peaks), a character from Twin Peaks season 3
- The Firemen, a 1994 SNES video game

== See also ==
- Firefighter (disambiguation)
- Fire Fighters (disambiguation)
