= Germanium Detector Array =

Neutrinoless double beta decay experiment

The Germanium Detector Array (or GERDA) experiment was searching for neutrinoless double beta decay (0νββ) in Ge-76 at the underground Laboratori Nazionali del Gran Sasso (LNGS). Neutrinoless beta decay is expected to be a very rare process if it occurs. The collaboration predicted less than one event each year per kilogram of material, appearing as a narrow spike around the 0νββ Q-value (Q_{ββ} = 2039 keV) in the observed energy spectrum. This meant background shielding was required to detect any rare decays. The LNGS facility has 1400 meters of rock overburden, equivalent to 3000 meters of water shielding, reducing cosmic radiation background. The GERDA experiment was operated from 2011 onwards at LNGS.

GERDA reported its final results in December 2020 in the Physical Review Letters. The experiment reached all the goals that it set to itself, but no detection of any 0νββ events was made.

After completing the GERDA experiment, the GERDA collaboration merged with MAJORANA-collaboration to build a new experiment LEGEND.

The experience from GERDA led to the expectation that further background reduction was in reach so that a background-free experiment with an even larger source strength, respectively exposure, became possible. The LEGEND collaboration, continuing GERDA's work, was aiming at increasing the sensitivity to the half-life of 0νββ decay up to $10^{28} yr$. In a first phase, it planned to deploy a mass of 200 kg of enriched germanium detectors in the slightly modified infrastructure of GERDA with the start of data taking planned for 2021.

== Design ==
The experiment used high purity enriched Ge crystal diodes (HPGe) as a beta decay source and particle detector. The detectors from the HdM (Heidelberg-Moscow) and IGEX experiments were reprocessed and used in phase 1. The detector array was suspended in a liquid argon cryostat lined with copper and surrounded by an ultra-pure water tank. PMTs in the water tank and plastic scintillators above detected and excluded background muons. Pulse-shape discrimination (PSD) was applied as a cut to discriminate between particle types.

GERDA followed in the footsteps of other 0νββ experiments using germanium; already more than 50 years ago (that is, around 1970), a 0.1 kg germanium detector was used by a Milano group in the first 0νββ decay search with a germanium detector. Since then, the sensitivity had been increased by a factor of one million.

Phase 2 increased the active mass to 38 kg using 30 new broad energy germanium (BEGe) detectors. A magnitude reduction in background was planned to 10^{−3} counts/(keV·kg·yr) using cleaner materials. This increased the half-life sensitivity to 10^{26} years once 100 kg·yr of data was taken and enabled evaluation of possible ton-scale expansion.

== Results ==
Phase I collected data November 2011 to May 2013, with 21.6 kg·yr exposure. No neutrinoless decays were observed, yielding a 0νββ 90% CL half-life limit of $T_{0 \nu \beta \beta} > 2.1 \cdot 10^{25} yr$. This limit could be combined with previous results, increasing it to 3·10^{25} yr, disfavoring the Heidelberg-Moscow detection claim. A bound on the effective neutrino mass was also reported: m_{ν} < 400 meV.

The double beta decay (with two neutrinos) half-life was also measured: T_{2νββ} = 1.84·10^{21} yr.

Phase II had additional enriched Ge detectors and reduced background, raising the sensitivity about one order of magnitude.

Phase II (7 strings, 35.8 kg of enriched detectors) was started in Dec 2015.

Preliminary results of Phase II have been published in Nature. The background index for BEGe detectors was 0.7·10^{−3} counts/(keV·kg·yr), which translated to less than one count in the signal region after an exposure of 100 kg·yr. Again no neutrinoless decays were observed, bringing the present limit on the half life to T_{1/2} > 5.3·10^{25} yr (90% C.L.).

As of 2018, the Phase II data-taking continued.

In December 2020, the final results of GERDA were reported. There was no detection of 0νββ, and the experiment reported lower limit for the 0νββ half-life in Ge-76 of $T_{0 \nu \beta \beta} > 1.8 \cdot 10^{26} yr$. The reported final lower limit agreed with the expected value for the sensitivity of the experiment, and was the most stringent value for the decay of any 0νββ isotope ever measured. Also the background event rate of GERDA was cutting-edge level in the field. In its final phase GERDA deployed 41 germanium detectors with a total mass of 44.2 kg, with very high germanium-76 enrichment percent.

== Publications ==
- GERDA collaboration, Agostini M.; et al. (19 September 2013). "Results on Neutrinoless Double-β Decay of ^{76}Ge from Phase I of the GERDA Experiment" (PDF). Physical Review Letters. 111 (12) 122503. arXiv:1307.4720. Bibcode:2013PhRvL.111l2503A. doi:10.1103/PhysRevLett.111.122503. PMID 24093254.
- GERDA collaboration, Agostini M.; et al. (12 February 2013). "Measurement of the half-life of the two-neutrino double beta decay of ^{76}Ge with the GERDA experiment". Journal of Physics G. 40 (3) 035110. arXiv:1212.3210. Bibcode:2013JPhG...40c5110T. doi:10.1088/0954-3899/40/3/035110. S2CID 119118050.
- GERDA collaboration, Ackermann K.-H.; et al. (March 2013). "The GERDA experiment for the search of 0νββ decay in ^{76}Ge". European Physical Journal C. 73 (3): 2330. arXiv:1212.4067. Bibcode:2013EPJC...73.2330A. doi:10.1140/epjc/s10052-013-2330-0.
- GERDA collaboration, Agostini M.; et al. (5 April 2017). "Background-free search for neutrinoless double-β decay of ^{76}Ge with GERDA". Nature. 544 (7648): 47–52. arXiv:1703.00570. Bibcode:2017Natur.544...47A. doi:10.1038/nature21717. PMID 28382980. S2CID 4456764.
