= Double electron capture =

Mode of radioactive decay

Double electron capture is a type of double beta decay, a permissible decay mode of an atomic nucleus. For a nuclide (A, Z) with a number of nucleons A and atomic number Z, double electron capture is only possible if the mass of the nuclide (A, Z−2) is lower.

In the ordinary mode, two of the orbital electrons are captured via the weak interaction by two protons in the nucleus, forming two neutrons and two neutrinos. Since the protons are changed to neutrons, the number of neutrons increases by two, while the number of protons Z decreases by two, and the atomic mass number A remains unchanged - the same as two successive electron captures. As a result, by reducing the atomic number by two, double electron capture transforms the nuclide into a different element.

Example:

^{130}_{56}Ba	+	2 e^{−}	→	^{130}_{54}Xe	+	2 ν_{e}

== Rarity ==
In most cases this decay mode is masked by other, more probable modes involving fewer particles, such as single electron capture. When all other modes are forbidden (energetically disallowed, or rarely, strongly suppressed) double electron capture becomes the main mode of decay. There exist 34 naturally occurring nuclei that are able to undergo double electron capture, but the process has been confirmed by observation in the decay of only three nuclides: ^{78}_{36}Kr, ^{124}_{54}Xe, and ^{130}_{56}Ba.

One reason is that the probability of double electron capture is exceedingly small; the half-lives for this mode lie well above 10^{20} years. A second reason is that the only detectable particles created in this process are X-rays and Auger electrons that are emitted by the excited atomic shell; as the parent and daughter nuclei (being even-even) are both 0+ states, and a 0+ -> 0+ transition is allowed, no gamma radiation is expected. The X-rays have energies near the electron binding energies (< 100 keV), where the background is high. Thus, the experimental detection of double electron capture is more difficult than that for negative double beta decay.

== Modes with positron emission ==
If the mass difference between the mother and daughter atoms is more than two masses of an electron (1.022 MeV), the energy released in the process is enough to allow another mode of decay, called electron capture with positron emission. It occurs along with double electron capture, their branching ratio depending on nuclear properties.

When the mass difference is more than four electron masses (2.044 MeV), the third mode, called double positron decay, is allowed. Only six naturally occurring nuclides (^{78}Kr, ^{96}Ru, ^{106}Cd, ^{124}Xe, ^{130}Ba, and ^{136}Ce) plus the non-primordial ^{148}Gd and ^{154}Dy are energetically allowed to decay by any of these three modes.

== Neutrinoless double electron capture ==
The above-described process with the capture of two electrons and emission of two neutrinos (two-neutrino double electron capture) is allowed by the Standard Model of particle physics: No conservation laws (including lepton number conservation) are violated. However, if the lepton number is not conserved, or equivalently the neutrino is its own antiparticle, a process with no neutrino emission can occur, as with ordinary double beta decay. This is neutrinoless double electron capture, which, from conservation of energy, would require the emission of a gamma photon simultaneously. That and further restrictions make the simple process most unlikely, and the electron capture with positron emission should dominate for the neutrinoless mode (if it occurs).

Example:

^{130}_{56}Ba	+	2 e^{−}	→	^{130}_{54}Xe	+	γ

or, more likely:

^{130}_{56}Ba	+	e^{−}	→	^{130}_{54}Xe	+	e^{+}

This has of course never been observed experimentally, and as any form of neutrinoless double beta decay contradicts the Standard Model.

== See also ==
- Double beta decay
- Neutrinoless double beta decay
- Beta decay
- Neutrino
- Particle radiation
- Radioactive isotope
