= Firefight =

Firefight or fire fight most often refers to:

- Firefighting, the profession of controlling and extinguishing fire
- Shootout or firefight, a combat between armed groups using firearms

Firefight or fire fight may also refer to:

- Firefight: Modern U.S. and Soviet Small Unit Tactics, a 1976 board game
- Fire Fight, a 1996 video game
- Firefight, a 2003 novel by Thomas Easton
- Firefight, a multiplayer game mode in the Halo 3: ODST and Halo: Reach video games
- Firefight (album), a 2011 album by Blackguard
- Firefight, a 2015 novel in The Reckoners series by Brandon Sanderson
- Fire Fight Australia, a 2020 benefit concert in Sydney, Australia
- Firefight (1986 film), an American short film
- Firefight (2003 film), an American film

== See also ==
- Firefighter (disambiguation)
