= Neutrinoless double beta decay =

Theorized type of radioactive decay

Neutrinoless double beta decay (0νββ) is a commonly proposed and experimentally pursued theoretical radioactive decay process that would prove a Majorana nature of the neutrino particle. To this day, it has not been found.

The discovery of neutrinoless double beta decay could shed light on the absolute neutrino masses and on their mass hierarchy (Neutrino mass). It would mean the first ever signal of the violation of total lepton number conservation. A Majorana nature of neutrinos would confirm that the neutrino is its own antiparticle.

To search for neutrinoless double beta decay, there are currently a number of experiments underway, with several future experiments for increased sensitivity proposed as well.

== History ==
In 1935 Maria Goeppert Mayer proposed the idea of double beta decay. Two years later, in 1937, the Italian physicist Ettore Majorana first introduced the concept of a particle being its own antiparticle, explicitly mentioning his theory's possible application to neutrinos. Particles of this nature were subsequently named after him as Majorana particles.

In 1939, Wendell H. Furry realized that Majorana's theory allowed a new decay channel. Furry stated the transition probability to even be higher for double beta decay in Majorana's symmetrical theory of the neutrino when compared with the original Dirac-Fermi theory. The privative label "neutrino-less" appeared in 1953 and largely replaced the original terminology.

This theoretical decay was the first idea proposed which could be used to search for the violation of lepton number conservation. It has, since then, drawn attention for being useful to study the nature of neutrinos (see quote).

[T]he 0ν mode ... violates the lepton number and has been recognized since a long time as a powerful tool to test neutrino properties. — Oliviero Cremonesi

== Physical relevance ==
=== Conventional double beta decay ===
Neutrinos are conventionally produced in weak decays. Weak beta decays normally produce one electron (or positron), emit an antineutrino (or neutrino) and increase (or decrease) the nucleus' proton number, $\ Z\ ,$ by one, while leaving its atomic weight, $\ A\ ,$ unchanged:

$\ (A,Z)\ \longrightarrow\ (A,Z+1)\ +\ e^{-}\ +\ \bar{\nu}_e \quad$ and
$$\ (A,Z)\ \longrightarrow\ (A,Z-1)\ +\ e^{+}\ +\ \nu_e ~.$$

The nucleus' mass (i.e. binding energy) is then lower and thus more favorable. There exist a number of elements that can decay into a nucleus of lower mass, but they cannot emit one electron only because the resulting nucleus is kinematically (that is, in terms of energy) not favorable (its energy would be higher). These nuclei can only decay by emitting two electrons (that is, via double beta decay). There are about a dozen nuclei that have been confirmed to decay only via a double beta decay. The corresponding decay equation is:

$\ (A,Z)\ \longrightarrow\ (A,Z+2)\ +\ 2\ e^{-}\ +\ 2\ \bar{\nu}_e ~.$

It is a weak process of second order. A simultaneous decay of two nucleons in the same nucleus is extremely unlikely. Thus, the experimentally observed lifetimes of such decay processes are on the order of 10^{18} ~ 10^{21} years. A number of isotopes have been observed already to show this two-neutrino double beta decay.

This conventional double beta decay is allowed in the Standard Model of particle physics. It has thus both a theoretical and an experimental foundation.

=== Overview ===
In this Feynman diagram of neutrinoless double beta decay, two neutrons decay into two protons and two electrons, but no neutrino is in the final state. The existence of this mechanism would require the neutrinos to be Majorana particles.

If the nature of the neutrinos is Majorana, then they can be emitted and absorbed in the same process without showing up in the corresponding final state. As Dirac particles, both the neutrinos produced by the decay of the W bosons would be emitted, and not absorbed after.

Neutrinoless double beta decay can only occur if both

- the neutrino particle is Majorana, and
- there exists a right-handed component of the weak leptonic current or the neutrino can change its handedness between emission and absorption (between the two W vertices), which is possible for a non-zero neutrino mass (for at least one of the neutrino species).

The simplest decay process is known as the light neutrino exchange. It features one neutrino emitted by one nucleon and absorbed by another nucleon (see figure to the right). In the final state, the only remaining parts are the nucleus (with its changed proton number $\ Z\$) and two electrons:

$\ (A,Z) \longrightarrow (A,Z+2) + 2 e^{-} ~.$

The two electrons are emitted quasi-simultaneously.

The two resulting electrons are then the only emitted particles in the final state and must carry approximately the difference of the sums of the binding energies of the two nuclei before and after the process as their kinetic energy. The heavy nuclei do not carry significant kinetic energy.

In that case, the decay rate can be calculated with

$$\ \Gamma_{\beta\beta}^{0\nu}\ =\ \frac{1}{T_{\beta\beta}^{0\nu}}\ =\ G^{0\nu}\ \left| M^{0\nu} \right|^2\ \langle m_{\beta\beta} \rangle^2\ ,$$

where $\ G^{0\nu}\$ denotes the phase space factor, $\ \left| M^{0\nu}\right|^2\$ the (squared) matrix element of this nuclear decay process (according to the Feynman diagram), and $\ \langle m_{\beta\beta}\rangle^2\$ the square of the effective Majorana mass.

First, the effective Majorana mass can be obtained by

$$\ \langle m_{\beta\beta}\rangle\ =\ \sum_i\ U_{ei}^2\ m_i\ ,$$

where $\ m_i\$ are the (estimated) Majorana neutrino masses (three neutrinos $\ \nu_i\$) and $\ U_{ei}\$ are the elements of the electron column of the neutrino mixing matrix $\ U\$ (see PMNS matrix). Contemporary experiments to find neutrinoless double beta decays (see section on experiments) aim at both the proof of the Majorana nature of neutrinos and the measurement of this effective Majorana mass $\ \langle m_{\beta\beta}\rangle\$ (can only be done if the decay is actually generated by the neutrino masses).

The nuclear matrix element (NME, $\ \left| M^{0\nu}\right|\ ,$) cannot be measured independently, but it can be calculated. The calculation itself relies on sophisticated nuclear many-body theories and there exist different methods to do this. The NME, $\ \left| M^{0\nu}\right|\ ,$ differs also from nucleus to nucleus (i.e. chemical element to chemical element). Today, the calculation of the NME is a significant problem and it has been treated by different authors in different ways. One question is whether to treat the range of obtained values for $\ \left| M^{0\nu}\right|\$ as the theoretical uncertainty and whether this is then to be understood as a statistical uncertainty. Different approaches are being chosen here. The obtained values for $\ \left| M^{0\nu}\right|\$ often vary by factors of 2 up to about 5. Typical values lie in the range of from about 0.9 ~ 14, depending on the decaying nucleus / element.

Lastly, the phase-space factor $\ G^{0\nu}\$ must also be calculated. It depends on the atomic number $Z$ and the total released kinetic energy (the "$Q$-value"):

$$\ Q\ =\ M_\mathsf{nucleus}^\mathsf{before}\ -\ M_\mathsf{nucleus}^\mathsf{after}\ -\ 2\ m_\mathsf{electron} ~.$$

Methods use Dirac wave functions, finite nuclear sizes and electron screening. There exist high-precision results for $G^{0\nu}$ for various nuclei, ranging from about 0.23 (for $\ \mathrm{^{128}_{~52}Te \rightarrow {}^{128}_{~54}Xe }\$), and 0.90 ($\ \mathrm{^{76}_{32}Ge\rightarrow {}^{76}_{34}Se}\$) to about 24.14 ($\ \mathrm{^{150}_{~60}Nd \rightarrow {}^{150}_{~62}Sm}\$).

It is believed that, if neutrinoless double beta decay is found under certain conditions (decay rate compatible with predictions based on experimental knowledge about neutrino masses and mixing), this would indeed "likely" point at Majorana neutrinos as the main mediator (and not other sources of new physics). There are 35 nuclei that can undergo neutrinoless double beta decay (according to the aforementioned decay conditions).

== Experiments and results ==
Nine different candidates of nuclei are being considered in experiments to confirm neutrinoless double beta-decay: $\mathrm{ {}^{48}Ca, {}^{76}Ge, {}^{82}Se, {}^{96}Zr, {}^{100}Mo, {}^{116}Cd, {}^{130}Te, {}^{136}Xe, {}^{150}Nd } ~.$ They all have arguments for and against their use in an experiment. Factors to be included and revised are natural abundance, reasonably priced enrichment, and a well understood and controlled experimental technique. The higher the $Q$-value, the better are the chances of a discovery, in principle. The phase-space factor $\ G^{0\nu}\ ,$ and thus the decay rate, grows with $\ Q^5 ~.$

Experimentally of interest and thus measured is the sum of the kinetic energies of the two emitted electrons. It should equal the $Q$-value of the respective nucleus for neutrinoless double beta emission.

The table shows a summary of the currently best limits on the lifetime of 0νββ. This data indicates that if it occurs at all, neutrinoless double beta decay is an extremely rare process.

Experimental limits
Isotope	Experiment	lifetime $T_{\beta\beta}^{0\nu}$ [years]	Ref.
$\mathrm{ {}^{48}Ca}~$	ELEGANT-VI	$\ > 1.4\cdot 10^{22}$	
$\mathrm{ {}^{76}Ge}~$	Heidelberg-Moscow	$\ > 1.9\cdot 10^{25}$	
$\mathrm{ {}^{76}Ge}~$	GERDA	$\ > 1.8\cdot 10^{26}$	
$\mathrm{ {}^{76}Ge}~$	MAJORANA	$\ > 8.3\cdot 10^{25}$	
$\mathrm{ {}^{76}Ge}~$	LEGEND	$\ > 1.9\cdot 10^{26}$	
$\mathrm{ {}^{82}Se}~$	NEMO-3	$\ > 2.5\cdot 10^{23}$	
$\mathrm{ {}^{82}Se}~$	CUPID-0	$\ > 4.6\cdot 10^{24}$	
$\mathrm{ {}^{96}Zr}~$	NEMO-3	$\ > 9.2\cdot 10^{21}$	
$\mathrm{ {}^{100}Mo}~$	NEMO-3	$\ > 2.1\cdot 10^{25}$	
$\mathrm{ {}^{116}Cd}~$	Aurora	$\ > 2.2\cdot 10^{23}$	
$\mathrm{ {}^{116}Cd}~$	Solotvina	$\ > 1.7\cdot 10^{23}$	
$\mathrm{ {}^{128}Te}~$	CUORE	$\ > 3.6\cdot 10^{24}~$	
$\mathrm{ {}^{130}Te}~$	CUORE	$\ > 3.5\cdot 10^{25}$	
$\mathrm{ {}^{136}Xe}~$	EXO	$\ > 3.5\cdot 10^{25}$	
$\mathrm{ {}^{136}Xe}~$	KamLAND-Zen	$\ > 3.8\cdot 10^{26}~$	
$\mathrm{ {}^{150}Nd}~$	NEMO-3	$\ > 2.1\cdot 10^{25}$	
Experimental limits (at least 90% C.L.) on a collection of isotopes for 0νββ decay process mediated by the light neutrino mechanism, shown in the Feynman diagram above.

=== Heidelberg-Moscow collaboration ===
The so-called "Heidelberg-Moscow collaboration" (HDM; 1990–2003) of the German Max-Planck-Institut für Kernphysik and the Russian science center Kurchatov Institute in Moscow famously claimed to have found "evidence for neutrinoless double beta decay" (Heidelberg-Moscow controversy). Initially, in 2001 the collaboration announced a 2.2 σ, or a 3.1 σ evidence (depending on the used calculation method). The decay rate was found to be around $2\cdot 10^{25}\ \mathrm{years} ~.$ This result has been topic of discussions between many scientists and authors. To this day, no other experiment has ever confirmed or approved the result of the HDM group. Instead, recent results from the GERDA experiment for the lifetime limit clearly disfavor and reject the values of the HDM collaboration.

Neutrinoless double beta decay has not yet been found.

=== GERDA (Germanium Detector Array) experiment ===
The Germanium Detector Array (GERDA) collaboration's result of phase I of the detector was a limit of $T_{\beta\beta}^{0\nu}>2.1\cdot 10^{25}\ \mathrm{years}\$ (90% C.L.). It used germanium both as source and detector material. Liquid argon was used for muon vetoing and as a shielding from background radiation. The $Q$-value of ^{76}Ge for 0νββ decay is 2039 keV, but no excess of events in this region was found. Phase II of the experiment started data-taking in 2015, and it used around 36 kg of germanium for the detectors. The exposure analyzed until July 2020 was 10.8 kg yr. Again, no signal was found and thus a new limit was set to $\ T_{\beta\beta}^{0\nu} > 5.3\cdot 10^{25}\ \mathrm{years}\$ (90% C.L.). The detector has been decommissioned and published its final results in December 2020. No neutrinoless double beta decay was observed. The successor experiment is LEGEND, which uses the same technology to achieve sensitivity to longer lifetimes.

=== Majorana Demonstrator ===
The Majorana collaboration published their first result from data taken during construction, commissioning, and the beginning of operations in 2018. With a total of 9.95 kg yr of enriched ^{76}Ge exposure, the collaboration set a lower limit on the half-life of 0νββ in ^{76}Ge of $\ 1.9 \cdot 10^{25}\ \mathrm{years} ~.$ In 2019, a new result was published with 26.0 ± 0.5 kg·yr of enriched exposure. The Majorana Demonstrator observed one event in the region of interests, where only 0.65 events were expected from the estimated background. This resulted in a lower limit on the ^{76}Ge neutrinoless double-𝛽 decay half-life of $\ 2.7\cdot 10^{25}\ \mathrm{years}\$ (90% C.L.). The final result of the 0νββ search of the experiment was published in 2023, with a total enriched active exposure of 64.5 kg yr. This result set a half-life limit of 0νββ in ^{76}Ge at $T_{\beta\beta}^{0\nu}>8.3\cdot 10^{25}$yr (90% C.L.). Additionally, the Majorana Demonstrator had a world-leading energy resolution of 2.52 keV FWHM at the 2039 keV $Q_{\beta\beta}$. The Majorana collaboration merged with the GERDA collaboration to form LEGEND, their successor experiment.

=== EXO (Enriched Xenon Observatory) experiment ===
The Enriched Xenon Observatory-200 experiment uses xenon both as source and detector. The experiment is located in New Mexico (US) and uses a time-projection chamber (TPC) for three-dimensional spatial and temporal resolution of the electron track depositions. The EXO-200 experiment yielded a lifetime limit of $T_{\beta\beta}^{0\nu}>3.5\cdot 10^{25}\ \mathrm{years}\$ (90% C.L.). When translated to effective Majorana mass, this is a limit of the same order as that obtained by GERDA I and II.

=== Currently data-taking experiments ===
- CUORE (Cryogenic Underground Observatory for Rare Events) experiment:
  - The CUORE experiment consists of an array of 988 ultra-cold TeO_{2} crystals (for a total mass of 206 kg of $\mathrm{ {}^{130}Te}$) used as bolometers to detect the emitted beta particles and as the source of the decay. CUORE is located underground at the Laboratori Nazionali del Gran Sasso, and it began its first physics data run in 2017. CUORE published in 2020 results from the search for neutrinoless double-beta decay in $\mathrm{ {}^{130}Te}$ with a total exposure of 372.5 kg⋅yr, finding no evidence for 0νββ decay and setting a 90% CI Bayesian lower limit of $\ T_{\beta\beta}^{0\nu}>3.2\cdot 10^{25}\ \mathrm{years}\$ and in April 2022 a new limit was set on $\ T_{\beta\beta}^{0\nu}>2.2\cdot 10^{25}\ \mathrm{years}\$ at the same confidence level. Further results published in January 2026 increased the limit to $\ T_{\beta\beta}^{0\nu}>3.5\cdot 10^{25}\ \mathrm{years}\$.
- KamLAND-Zen (Kamioka Liquid Scintillator Antineutrino Detector-Zen) experiment:
  - The KamLAND-Zen experiment commenced using 13 tons of xenon as a source (enriched with about 320 kg of ^{136}Xe), contained in a nylon balloon that is surrounded by a liquid scintillator outer balloon of 13 m diameter. Starting in 2011, KamLAND-Zen Phase I started taking data, eventually leading to set a limit on the lifetime for neutrinoless double beta decay of $\ T_{\beta\beta}^{0\nu}>1.9\cdot 10^{25}\ \mathrm{years}\$ (90% C.L.). This limit could be improved by combining with Phase II data (data-taking started in December 2013) to $T_{\beta\beta}^{0\nu}>2.6\cdot 10^{25}\ \mathrm{years}\$ (90% C.L.). For Phase II, the collaboration especially managed to reduce the decay of $\mathrm{ {}^{110m}Ag}$, which disturbed the measurements in the region of interest for 0νββ decay of $\mathrm{ {}^{136}Xe}$. In August 2016, KamLAND-Zen 800 was completed containing 800 kg of $\mathrm{ {}^{136}Xe}$, reporting a limit of $T_{\beta\beta}^{0\nu}>1.07\cdot 10^{26}\ \mathrm{years}\$ (90% C.L.). In 2023 the limit was improved to $T_{\beta\beta}^{0\nu}>2.3\cdot 10^{26}\ \mathrm{years}\$ (90% C.L.), and in 2025 it was improved to $T_{\beta\beta}^{0\nu}>3.8\cdot 10^{26}\ \mathrm{years}\$ (90% C.L.).
- LEGEND
  - The LEGEND experiment consists of high-purity germanium detectors enriched to ~90% ^{76}Ge and immersed in a liquid argon cryostat, whose scintillation lights acts as a veto for external background events. The LEGEND experiment is the successor to the GERDA and MAJORANA Demonstrator experiments.
- JUNO (Jiangmen Underground Neutrino Observatory)

=== Proposed/future experiments ===
- nEXO experiment:
  - As EXO-200's successor, nEXO is planned to be a ton-scale experiment and part of the next generation of 0νββ experiments. The detector material is planned to weigh about 5 t, serving a 1% energy resolution at the $Q$-value. The experiment is planned to deliver a lifetime sensitivity of about $T_{\beta\beta}^{0\nu}>1.35\cdot 10^{28}\ \mathrm{years}\$ after 10 years of data-taking.
- SuperNEMO
- NuDoubt^{++}:
  - The NuDoubt⁺⁺ experiment aims at the measurement of two-neutrino and neutrinoless positive double weak decays (2β⁺/ECβ⁺). It is based on a new detector concept combining hybrid and opaque scintillators paired with a novel light read-out technique. The technology is particularly suitable detecting positrons (β⁺) signatures. In its first phase, NuDoubt⁺⁺ is going to operate under high-pressure loading of enriched ^{78}Kr gas. It expects to discover two-neutrino positive double weak decay modes of ^{78}Kr within 1 tonne-week exposure and is able to probe neutrinoless positive double weak decay modes at several orders of magnitude improved significance compared to current experimental limits. After 1 tonne-week exposure, a half-life sensitivity of $T_{\beta+\beta+}^{0\nu}> 10^{24}\ \mathrm{years}\$ (90% C.L.) is expected for ^{78}Kr. Later phases may involve searches for positive double weak decays in ^{124}Xe and ^{106}Cd.

== Neutrinoless muon conversion ==
The muon decays as $\mu^+\to e^{+}+\nu_{e}+\overline\nu_{\mu}$ and $\mu^-\to e^{-}+\overline\nu_{e}+\nu_{\mu}$. Decays without neutrino emission, such as $\mu^+ \to e^{+}+\gamma$, $\mu^{-}\to e^{-}+\gamma$, $\mu^{+}\to e^{+}+e^{-}+e^{+}$ and $\mu^{-}\to e^{-}+e^{+}+e^{-}$ are so unlikely that they are considered prohibited and their observation would be considered evidence of new physics. A number of experiments are pursuing this path such as Mu to E Gamma, Comet, and Mu2e for $\mu^+ \to e^{+}\gamma$ and Mu3e for $\mu^{+}\to e^{+}e^{-}e^{+}$.

Neutrinoless tau conversion in the form $\tau\to 3\mu$ has been searched for by the CMS experiment.

== See also ==
- Double beta decay
- Heidelberg-Moscow controversy
- Neutrinoless double electron capture
