= Neutrino Ettore Majorana Observatory =

International collaboration of scientists searching for neutrinoless double beta decay

Coordinates: 45.1785471°N 6.6890208°E

The Neutrino Ettore Majorana Observatory (NEMO experiment) is an international collaboration of scientists searching for neutrinoless double beta decay (0νββ). The collaboration has been active since 1989. Observation of 0νββ would indicate neutrinos are Majorana particles and could be used to measure the neutrino mass. It is located in the Modane Underground Laboratory (LSM) in the Fréjus Road Tunnel. The experiment has (as of 2018) had 3 detectors, NEMO-1, NEMO-2, NEMO-3 (and a demonstrator module of SuperNEMO-detector) and is planning (as of 2018) to construct a new detector SuperNEMO. The NEMO-1 and NEMO-2 prototype detectors were used until 1997. Latest experiment NEMO-3 was under design and construction from 1994 onwards, took data from January 2003 to January 2011 and the final data analysis was published in 2018. The NEMO-2 and NEMO-3 detectors produced measurements for double neutrino decays and limits for neutrinoless double-beta decay for a number of elements, such as molybdenum-100 and selenium-82. These double beta decay times are important contributions to understanding the nucleus and are needed inputs for neutrinoless decay studies, which constrain neutrino mass.

The NEMO collaboration remains active and is constructing an improved SuperNEMO detector. Planning of SuperNEMO and commissioning of SuperNEMO demonstrator module is on-going as of 2019.

== Experiment ==
Other 0νββ experiments use the same material for the source of double beta decays and the detector. This allows a large mass of source material to be used and thereby maximizes the sensitivity of the experiment, but limits its flexibility. NEMO takes a different approach, using thin foils of source material surrounded by a separate tracking calorimeter.

This allows the use of any source material which can be formed into a thin foil. Also, because its tracking is more accurate, it can reliably detect if two electrons come from the same place, thereby reducing false detections of double beta decays.

The experiment has a cylindrical shape with 20 sectors that contain different isotopes in the form of thin foils with a total surface of about 20 m^{2}. The main isotopes used for the neutrinoless double beta decay search are about 7 kg of enriched molybdenum-100 and about 1 kg of selenium-82. The experiment also contains smaller amounts of cadmium-116, neodymium-150, zirconium-96 and calcium-48 foils. Tellurium and copper foils are used for background measurements.

A tracking detector on each side of the foil detects electrons and positrons from the double beta decay. They are identified by their curvature in a magnetic field and particle energy is measured in a calorimeter. In 0νββ, the sum of the electron and positron energies will be the(Q value) released in double beta decay. For standard double beta decay the neutrinos, which cannot be observed directly, reduce the detected energy.

== Results ==
Neutrinoless double beta decay (0νββ) has not been observed in 5 years of data taking and limits have been set for several isotopes.

NEMO-2 reported 0νββ limits for Majoron models of ^{100}Mo, ^{116}Cd, ^{82}Se and ^{96}Zr.

NEMO-3 reported precision 2νββ half-lives for its 7 isotopes and 0νββ limits for ^{96}Zr, ^{48}Ca, ^{150}Nd at Neutrino08.

NEMO-3 reported 2νββ and more 0νββ limits at SUSY08.

In 2014, NEMO-3 reported a 47 kg⋅y search for 0νββ of molybdenum-100 yielded T_{1/2} > 1.1×10^{24} years. This can be translated into an upper limit on the effective neutrino mass: m_{v} < 0.3–0.9 eV, depending on the nuclear model.

NEMO 2νββ Half-life Measurements

Nuclide	Half-life, years
^{48}Ca	4.4+0.5 −0.4 ± 0.4 ×10^{19}
^{82}Se	9.6 ± 0.3 ± 1.0 ×10^{19}
^{96}Zr	2.35 ± 0.14 ± 0.16 ×10^{19}
^{116}Cd	2.8 ± 0.1 ± 0.3 ×10^{19}
^{130}Te	7.0 ± 0.9(stat) ± 1.1(syst) ×10^{20}
^{150}Nd	9.11+0.25 −0.22 ± 0.63 ×10^{18}
^{100}Mo	7.11 ± 0.02(stat) ± 0.54(syst) ×10^{18}

NEMO Highest 0νββ Decay Lower Limits

Isotope	T_{1/2} (yr)	Neutrino mass limit (eV)
^{82}Se	2.1×10^{23}	
^{100}Mo	1.1×10^{24}	0.9
^{116}Cd	1.6×10^{22}	
^{96}Zr	8.6×10^{21}	20.1
^{150}Nd	1.8×10^{22}	6.3
^{48}Ca	1.3×10^{22}	29.7

The ^{96}Zr decay is particularly relevant because of its high Q and use in searches for time-dependence of the physical constants. Geochemical measurements of ZrSiO_{4} allow comparison of its historic and present rates, by extracting the resultant ^{96}Mo.

The final results of NEMO-3 were published in 2018.

== SuperNEMO ==
A next generation experiment, SuperNEMO, is under construction. It is based on technology used by the NEMO-3 experiment, but will be more than a factor of ten bigger. The SuperNEMO detector will consist of 20 modules each containing approximately 5 kg of enriched double beta decay emitting isotope in the form of a thin foil. The installation of a first module (using selenium-82) in the LSM is under way, with data taking expected in the second half of 2015. As of 2019, the commissioning of the SuperNEMO demonstration module (basically one of the 20 modulus of the whole SuperNEMO) is underway, and the collaboration continues to plan to construct the whole 20-module SuperNEMO detector.
