= MAJORANA =

Particle research project

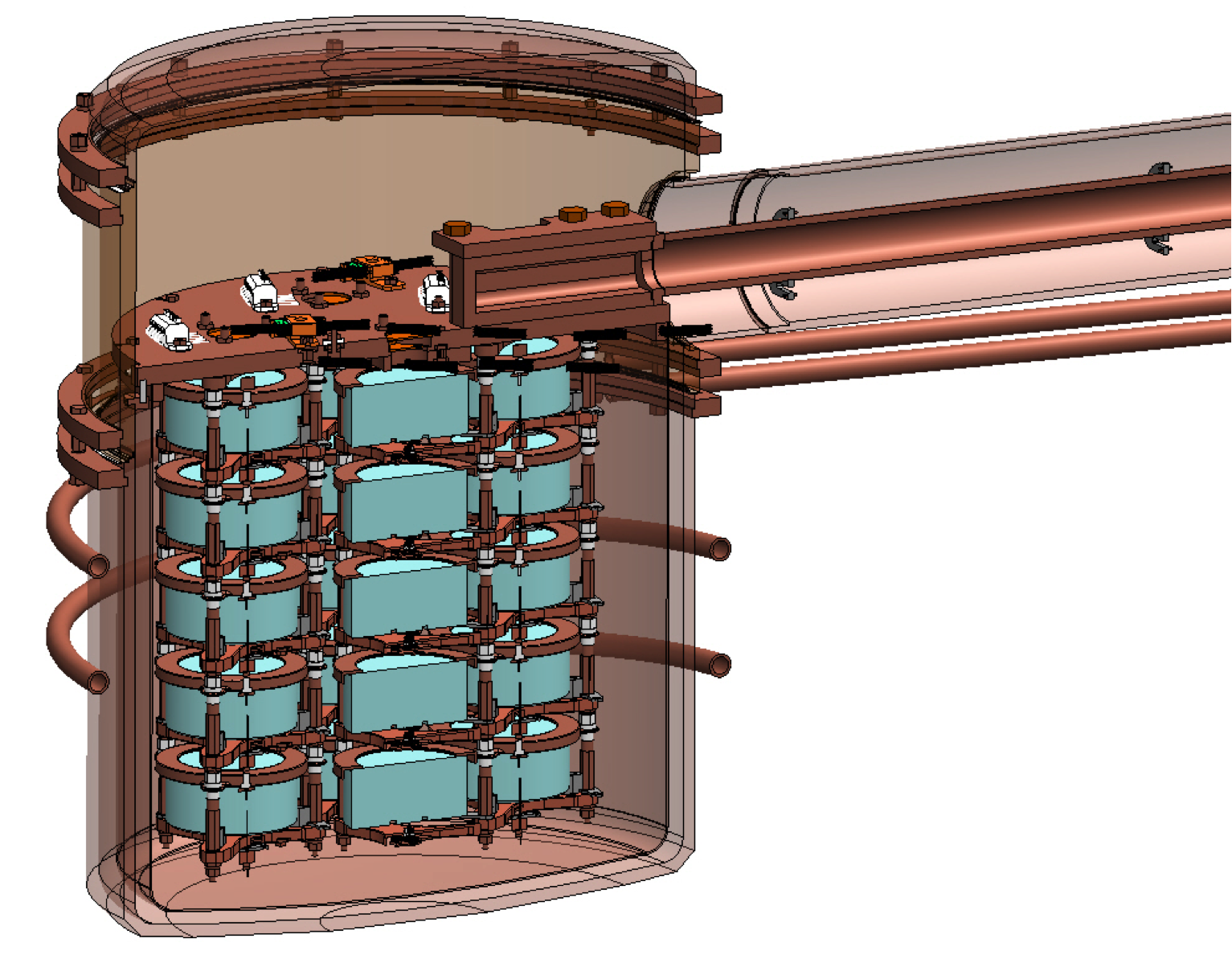
A MAJORANA Demonstrator copper vacuum cryostat showing strings of detectors (turquoise)

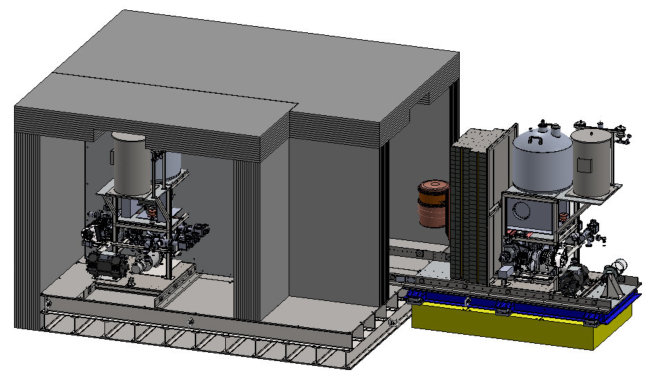
The MAJORANA Demonstrator

The MAJORANA project (styled Majorana) is an international effort to search for neutrinoless double beta decay (0νββ) in ^{76}Ge. The project builds upon the work of previous experiments, notably those performed by the Heidelberg–Moscow and IGEX collaborations, which used high-purity germanium (HPGe) detectors to study neutrinoless double-beta decay.

The first stage of the project is the Majorana Demonstrator (MJD), designed to demonstrate the technique and evaluate a ton-scale experiment.

Cryostats housing up to 40 kg of natural and enriched germanium detectors are being deployed in low-background vacuum cryostats at the Sanford Underground Laboratory, 1,480 m below ground in Lead, South Dakota. Following the Demonstrator, the collaboration intends to merge with the GERDA collaboration to build a much larger experiment called LEGEND.

== Physics ==
The goal of the project is to search for 0νββ decay in ^{76}Ge using HPGe detectors. Observation of 0νββ would establish that the neutrino is a Majorana particle and demonstrate violation of lepton number conservation, validating the seesaw mechanism as the explanation for the neutrino mass scale. It would also place constraints on the absolute neutrino mass.

The principal goal of the Majorana Demonstrator is to demonstrate the feasibility of achieving the background required in a ton-scale experiment. This corresponds to 4 counts/tonne/year in a 4 keV window around the 0νββ Q value of 2039 keV, which scales to 1 count/ton/year in a ton scale experiment. The experiment will use a mixture of detectors made with natural germanium and enriched germanium, allowing it to confirm or refute the controversial claim for 0νββ observation in ^{76}Ge by Klapdor-Kleingrothaus et al. (Heidelberg-Moscow experiment). If low enough electronic noise is achieved the Demonstrator may also make a search for WIMPs and axions.

== Design ==
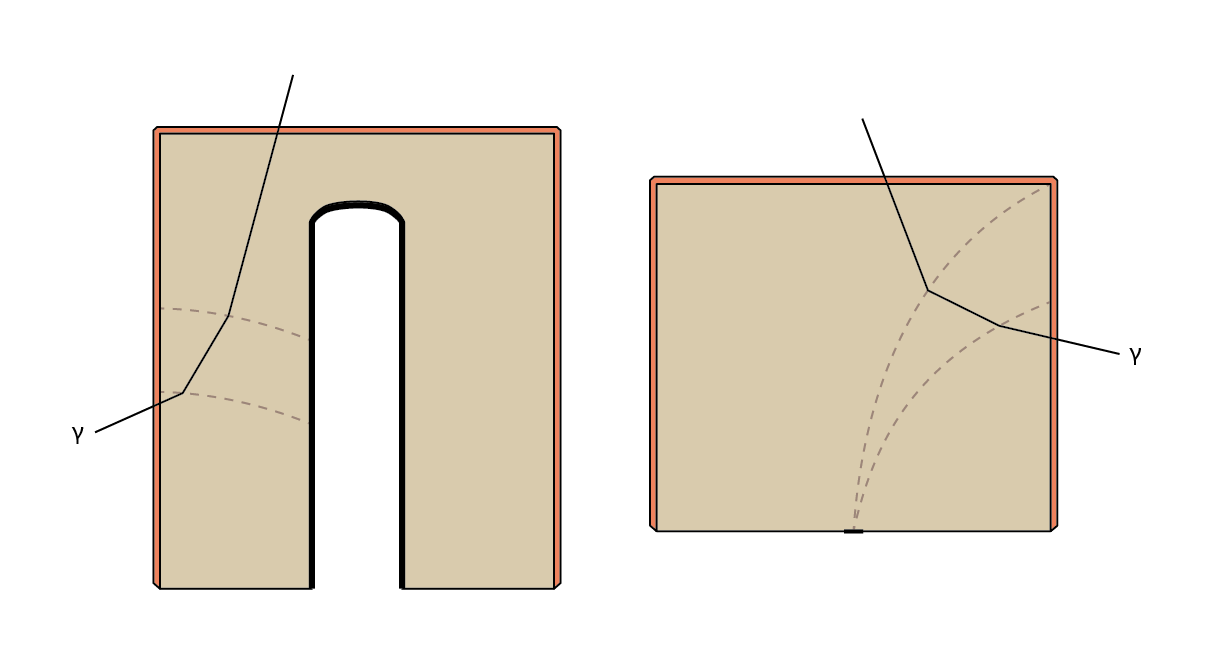
The drift of charge from a multiple gamma scatter in coaxial and point contact detectors.

The Majorana Demonstrator will proceed in three phases. A prototype cryostat containing 3 strings of non-enriched germanium is in commissioning. Two low-background cryostats with enriched detectors are planned, with a total of 40 kg germanium.

Electroformed copper and lead bricks protect the cryostats. Polyethylene shields the setup and includes PMTs to act as a veto. Nitrogen flushing removes trace radon.

=== Point contact detectors ===
P-type point contact (PPC) germanium detectors are used. This style of detector was chosen for many reasons, but chiefly because PPC detectors allow efficient discrimination of multiply scattering gamma backgrounds. This results from the weighting potential being strongly peaked close to the small electrode, meaning that as charge drifts towards the electrode there is a high probability of seeing distinct signals from each energy deposition, thus being able to reject events that do not emit these signals. Other advantages include the low capacitance due to the small contacts, reducing electronic noise and thresholds; and shielding surface alpha decays by the thick outer n-type contact.

== Status ==
In December 2014 the Majorana Demonstrator was under construction at the Sanford Underground Laboratory in Lead, South Dakota. The first module was expected in early 2015 with full operation expected in late 2015.

MALBEK was operated 2011–2012 at KURF (Kimballton Underground Research Facility) in Virginia as a WIMP detector to evaluate the broad energy (BEGe) PPCs. The background and behavior of the contacts was explored. No signal was seen, and the project could be a competitive search for low mass WIMPs.

The collection of data started June 2015. The construction completed with final configuration taking data since spring 2017. First results were announced October 2017. Data collection continued as of 2018.

On 3 March 2021, the Majorana Demonstrator stopped operation with enriched germanium detectors, in preparation for the LEGEND experiment. The enriched germanium detectors operated since June 2015 at the Sanford Underground Research Facility in South Dakota. In March 2021, the enriched germanium detectors were removed from the experiment apparatus and shipped to LNGS in Italy to be used in the LEGEND-200 experiment. However, the Majorana Demonstrator experimental apparatus remains operational and is planned to continue operation past March 2021 using germanium detectors made of natural (non-enriched) germanium (i.e. only the enriched germanium detectors ceased their operation and were removed from the Majorana Demonstrator in March 2021).

== Results ==
In February of 2023, the final results of the Majorana Demonstrator were reported. No detection of 0νββ decay was observed, however the experiment was able to report a half-life limit of T_{1/2} > 8.3·10^{25} yr (90% C.L.) which provides a range of upper limits on mββ of (113–269) meV (90% C.L.) (dependent on the choice of nuclear matrix elements). The Majorana Demonstrator was set a world-leading energy resolution of 2.52 keV FWHM at the 2039 keV Qββ (0.12%) and had a total of 64.5 kg yr of enriched active exposure.

== Bibliography ==
- The MAJORANA Collaboration (2008), The MAJORANA Neutrinoless Double-Beta Decay Program – An R&D plan to establish the feasibility of a 1-ton scale experiment
- Phillips II, D. G.; et al. (2011). "The MAJORANA experiment: An ultra-low background search for neutrinoless double-beta decay". Journal of Physics: Conference Series. 381 (381) 012044. arXiv:1111.5578. Bibcode:2012JPhCS.381a2044P. doi:10.1088/1742-6596/381/1/012044.
