= Enriched Xenon Observatory =

Particle physics experiment

Coordinates: 32°22′18″N 103°47′37″W

The Enriched Xenon Observatory (EXO) is a particle physics experiment searching for neutrinoless double beta decay of xenon-136 at WIPP near Carlsbad, New Mexico, U.S.

Neutrinoless double beta decay (0νββ) detection would prove the Majorana nature of neutrinos and impact the neutrino mass values and ordering. These are important open topics in particle physics.

EXO currently has a 200-kilogram xenon liquid time projection chamber (EXO-200) with R&D efforts on a ton-scale experiment (nEXO). Xenon double beta decay was detected and limits have been set for 0νββ.

== Overview ==
EXO measures the rate of neutrinoless decay events above the expected background of similar signals, to find or limit the double beta decay half-life, which relates to the effective neutrino mass using nuclear matrix elements. A limit on effective neutrino mass below 0.01 eV would determine the neutrino mass order. The effective neutrino mass is dependent on the lightest neutrino mass in such a way that that bound indicates the normal mass hierarchy.

The expected rate of 0νββ events is very low, so background radiation is a significant problem. WIPP has 650 metres (2,130 ft) of rock overburden—equivalent to 1,600 metres (5,200 ft) of water—to screen incoming cosmic rays. Lead shielding and a cryostat also protect the setup. The neutrinoless decays would appear as narrow spike in the energy spectrum around the xenon Q-value (Q_{ββ}= 2457.8 keV), which is fairly high and above most gamma decays.

== EXO-200 ==
=== History ===
EXO-200 was designed with a goal of less than 40 events per year within two standard deviations of expected decay energy. This background was achieved by selecting and screening all materials for radiopurity. Originally the vessel was to be made of Teflon, but the final design of the vessel uses thin, ultra-pure copper. EXO-200 was relocated from Stanford to WIPP in the summer of 2007. Assembly and commissioning continued until the end of 2009 with data taking beginning in May 2011. Calibration was done using ^{228}Th, ^{137}Cs, and ^{60}Co gamma sources.

=== Design ===
The prototype EXO-200 uses a copper cylindrical time projection chamber filled with 150 kilograms (331 lb) of pure liquid xenon. Xenon is a scintillator, so decay particles produce prompt light which is detected by avalanche photodiodes, providing the event time. A large electric field drives ionization electrons to wires for collection. The time between the light and first collection determines the z coordinate of the event, while a grid of wires determines the radial and angular coordinates.

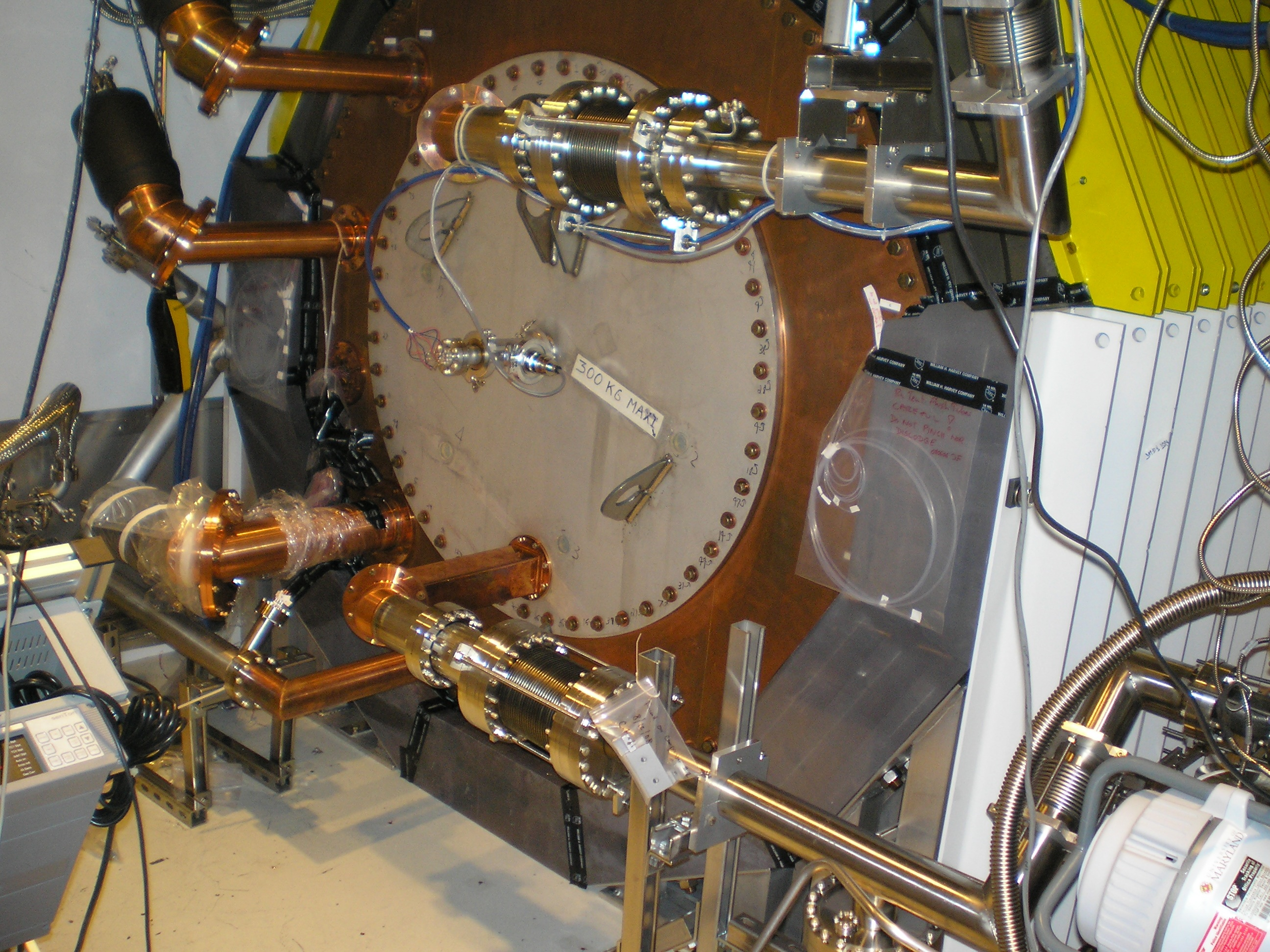
The EXO-200 cryostat installed underground at WIPP.

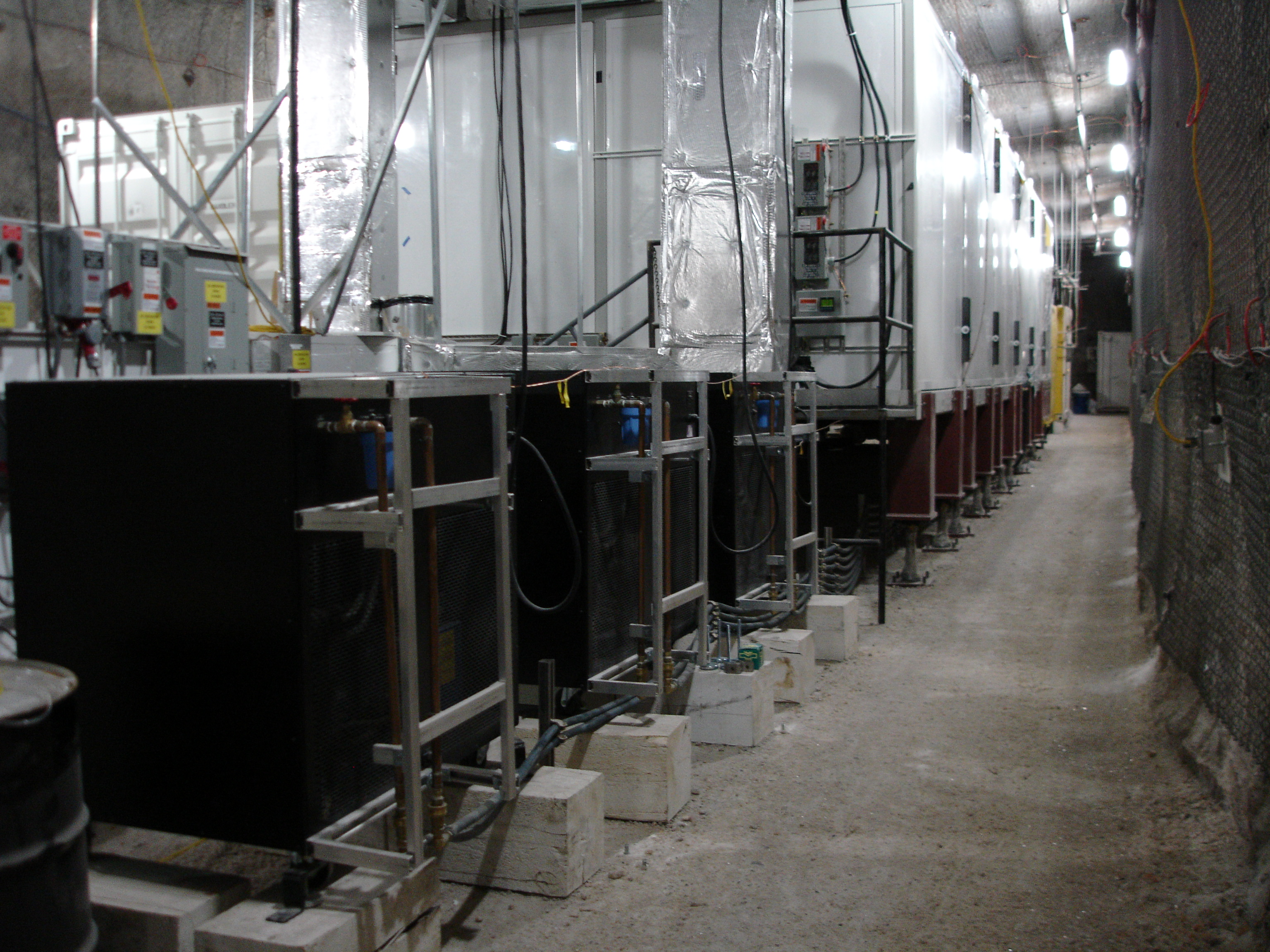
The EXO-200 cleanrooms installed underground at WIPP.

=== Results ===
The background from earth radioactivity(Th/U) and ^{137}Xe contamination led to ≈2×10^{−3} counts/(keV·kg·yr) in the detector. Energy resolution near Q_{ββ} of 1.53% was achieved.

In August 2011, EXO-200 was the first experiment to observe double beta decay of ^{136}Xe, with a half life of 2.11×10^{21} years. This is the slowest directly observed process. An improved half life of 2.165 ±0.016(stat) ±0.059(sys) × 10^{21} years was published in 2014. EXO set a limit on neutrinoless beta decay of 1.6×10^{25} years in 2012. A revised analysis of run 2 data with 100 kg·yr exposure, reported in the June issue of Nature reduced the limits on half-life to 1.1×10^{25} yr, and mass to 450 meV. This was used to confirm the power of the design and validate the proposed expansion.

Additional running for two years was taken.

EXO-200 has performed two scientific operations, Phase I (2011–2014) and after upgrades, Phase II (2016–2018) for a total exposure of 234.1 kg·yr. No evidence of neutrinoless double beta decay has been found in the combined Phase I and II data, giving the lower bound of $3.5 \cdot 10^{25}$ years for the half-life and upper mass of 239 meV. Phase II was the final operation of EXO-200.

== nEXO ==
A ton-scale experiment, nEXO (not an acryonym), must overcome many backgrounds. The EXO collaboration is exploring many possibilities to do so, including barium tagging in liquid xenon. Any double beta decay event will leave behind a daughter barium ion, while backgrounds, such as radioactive impurities or neutrons, will not. Requiring a barium ion at the location of an event eliminates all backgrounds. Tagging of a single ion of barium has been demonstrated and progress has been made on a method for extracting ions out of the liquid xenon. A freezing probe method has been demonstrated, and gaseous tagging is also being developed.

The 2014 EXO-200 paper indicated a 5000 kg TPC can improve the background by xenon self-shielding and better electronics. Diameter would be increased to 130 cm and a water tank would be added as shielding and muon veto. This is much larger than the attenuation length for gamma rays. Radiopure copper for nEXO has been completed. It is planned for installation in the SNOLAB "Cryopit".

An October 2017 paper details the experiment and discusses the sensitivity and the discovery potential of nEXO for neutrinoless double beta decay. Details on the ionization readout of the TPC have also been published.

The pre-Conceptual Design Report (pCDR) for nEXO was published in 2018. The planned location is SNOLAB, Canada.
