= Edward L. Fireman =

American physicist (1922–1990)

- Born: 1922; Pittsburgh, Pennsylvania
- Died: March 29, 1990 (aged 67–68); Boston, Massachusetts
- Education: Carnegie Institute of Technology
- Scientific career
- Fields: Physics
- Workplaces: Brookhaven National Laboratory; Smithsonian Astrophysical Observatory

Edward L. Fireman (1922 – March 29, 1990) was an American physicist, known for his radiometric dating method of freshly fallen meteorites.

== Biography ==
Fireman was born in Pittsburgh, Pennsylvania in 1922. In 1943 he got a bachelor's degree from Carnegie Institute of Technology (since merged with another institution to become Carnegie Mellon University). In 1948 he got a doctorate from Princeton University, where his thesis advisor was John Archibald Wheeler, and in 1950 got a job as a physicist at the Brookhaven National Laboratory. He started working for the Smithsonian Astrophysical Observatory in 1956 where he remained until his death. Fireman died Thursday, March 29, 1990, in Boston from a heart attack, at the age of 68.

== Researches ==
His research included the analysis of lunar samples, meteorites, and recovered satellites. He also was investigating cosmic rays, muons, solar flares, and neutrinos. He also developed methods for measuring the ages of prehistoric polar ice and designed a climatic record chart. He studied the cosmic neutrino background needed to interpret the solar neutrino experiment of his friend and collaborator Raymond Davis Jr. at Homestake Mine in South Dakota by using the overlaying soil and rock as a filter to remove other types of radiation. He was a member of many different scientific societies, and the writer of more than 200 scientific papers.

== Honors ==
The asteroid 4231 Fireman, discovered at Harvard's Oak Ridge Observatory in 1976, was named in his memory. The official naming citation was published by the Minor Planet Center on 27 June 1991 (M.P.C. 18457).
