= Neutrino mass hierarchy =

Open question in particle physics

The neutrino mass hierarchy is an open question in particle physics. Neutrinos are the lightest particles in the Standard Model which are known to have mass. Experimental measurements of neutrino oscillations can only determine the differences between neutrino masses, not the absolute masses themselves. Therefore, there are two possible arrangements consistent with current data: the normal ordering (NO) and the inverted ordering (IO), also called the normal hierarchy (NH) and inverted hierarchy (IH). Establishing the mass hierarchy is an active research topic, with several ongoing experiments investigating it.

Unsolved problem in physics
Is the neutrino mass hierarchy normal or inverted?
More unsolved problems in physics

== Neutrino mixing and oscillation ==
There are three types of neutrinos defined based on their role in the weak interaction: the electron neutrino $\nu_e$, muon neutrino $\nu_\mu$, and tau neutrino $\nu_\tau$. These are known as flavor eigenstates. Each one of these flavor states is not associated with an independent mass, but instead is a mixture (quantum superposition) of all three mass eigenstates. Mathematically, the flavor and mass eigenstates are related via a $3 \times 3$ unitary matrix, called the PMNS matrix:

$$\begin{bmatrix} ~ \nu_\mathrm{e} \\ ~ \nu_\mu \\ ~ \nu_\tau ~ \end{bmatrix}
= \begin{bmatrix} ~ U_{\mathrm{e} 1} ~ & ~ U_{\mathrm{e} 2} ~ & ~ U_{\mathrm{e} 3} \\ ~ U_{\mu 1} & ~ U_{\mu 2} ~ & ~ U_{\mu 3} \\ ~ U_{\tau 1} ~ & ~ U_{\tau 2} ~ & ~ U_{\tau 3} \end{bmatrix} \begin{bmatrix} ~ \nu_1 \\ ~ \nu_2 \\ ~ \nu_3 ~ \end{bmatrix} ~$$

where Greek letters denote the flavor and Arabic numerals denote mass states. Neutrinos propagate as mass eigenstates, since those are the states with definite energy and therefore well-defined time evolution. Oscillations between flavor states depend on the neutrino’s energy, the distance traveled, and the squared difference between the mass eigenstates $\Delta m^2$.

== Neutrino mass hierarchy ==
Pictorial representation of the neutrino mass hierarchies, with colors representing the flavor components of each mass eigenstate.

Since only the mass differences of neutrino mass eigenstates can be measured, there are two possible orderings:

- the normal ordering (NO) is $\ m_1 < m_2 < m_3\ ,\$ and
- the inverted ordering (IO) is $\ m_3 < m_1 < m_2 ~.$

The two orderings are distinguished by the placement of $\ m_3 ~.$ The smaller mass-squared difference $\ \Delta m_{21}^2 = m_2^2 - m_1^2\$ comes from observations of the Sun’s neutrino flux and is known to be positive. On the other hand, the larger difference delta $\ \Delta m_{3 \ell}^2 = m_3^2 - m_{\ell}^2\$ (where $\ \ell = 2\$ for NO and $\ \ell = 1\$ for IO) is obtained from oscillations in atmospheric neutrino caused by cosmic rays. Currently, the NO is favored over the IO.

According to the latest global analysis (September 2024) of neutrino oscillation measurement by the NuFIT project:

- $\ \Delta m_{2 1}^2 = 7{.}49^{ +0{.}19 }_{ -0{.}19 } \times 10^{-5}\ \mathrm{eV}^2\ ,$
- $\ \Delta m_{3 \ell}^2 = 2.513^{ +0{.}021 }_{ -0{.}019 } \times 10^{-3}\ \mathrm{eV}^2\$ for the NO, or
- $\ \Delta m_{3 \ell}^2 = -2{.}484^{ +0{.}020 }_{ -0{.}020 } \times 10^{-3}\ \mathrm{eV}^2\$ for the IO.

The data here includes atmospheric neutrino results from the Super-Kamiokande and IceCube experiments.

Even if the problem of the mass hierarchy was resolved, the absolute scale of the masses themselves would remain elusive. However, upper and lower limits on the masses are obtained from beta decay experiments, cosmological observations, and proposed processes like neutrinoless double beta decay. For example, studies of the cosmic microwave background and scans of large-scale structure in the universe provide an upper limit to the sum of the three neutrino masses.

The neutrino mass hierarchy remains an open problem in neutrino physics, along with the question of whether they are Dirac or Majorana fermions, and the CP-violating phase of the neutrino mixing matrix.
