= Peskin–Takeuchi parameter =

Variables used in quantum field theory

In particle physics, the Peskin–Takeuchi parameters are a set of three measurable quantities, called S, T, and U, that parameterize potential new physics contributions to electroweak radiative corrections. They are named after physicists Michael Peskin and Tatsu Takeuchi, who proposed the parameterization in 1990; proposals from two other groups (see References below) came almost simultaneously.

The Peskin–Takeuchi parameters are defined so that they are all equal to zero at a reference point in the Standard Model, with a particular value chosen for the (then unmeasured) Higgs boson mass. The parameters are then extracted from a global fit to the high-precision electroweak data from particle collider experiments (mostly the Z pole data from the CERN LEP collider) and atomic parity violation.

The measured values of the Peskin–Takeuchi parameters agree with the Standard Model. They can then be used to constrain models of new physics beyond the Standard Model. The Peskin–Takeuchi parameters are only sensitive to new physics that contributes to the oblique corrections, i.e., the vacuum polarization corrections to four-fermion scattering processes.

== Definitions ==
The Peskin–Takeuchi parameterization is based on the following assumptions about the nature of the new physics:

1. The electroweak gauge group is given by SU(2)_{L} x U(1)_{Y}, and thus there are no additional electroweak gauge bosons beyond the photon, Z boson, and W boson. In particular, this framework assumes there are no Z' or W' gauge bosons. If there are such particles, the S, T, U parameters do not in general provide a complete parameterization of the new physics effects.
2. New physics couplings to light fermions are suppressed, and hence only oblique corrections need to be considered. In particular, the framework assumes that the nonoblique corrections (i.e., vertex corrections and box corrections) can be neglected. If this is not the case, then the process by which the S, T, U parameters are extracted from the precision electroweak data is no longer valid, and they no longer provide a complete parameterization of the new physics effects.
3. The energy scale at which the new physics appears is large compared to the electroweak scale. This assumption is inherent in defining S, T, U independent of the momentum transfer in the process.

With these assumptions, the oblique corrections can be parameterized in terms of four vacuum polarization functions: the self-energies of the photon, Z boson, and W boson, and the mixing between the photon and the Z boson induced by loop diagrams.

Assumption number 3 above allows us to expand the vacuum polarization functions in powers of q^{2}/M^{2}, where M represents the heavy mass scale of the new interactions, and keep only the constant and linear terms in q^{2}. We have,

$\Pi_{\gamma\gamma}(q^2) = q^2 \Pi_{\gamma\gamma}^{\prime}(0) + ...$

$\Pi_{Z \gamma}(q^2) = q^2 \Pi_{Z \gamma}^{\prime}(0) + ...$

$\Pi_{ZZ}(q^2) = \Pi_{ZZ}(0) + q^2 \Pi_{ZZ}^{\prime}(0) + ...$

$\Pi_{WW}(q^2) = \Pi_{WW}(0) + q^2 \Pi_{WW}^{\prime}(0) + ...$

where $\Pi^{\prime}$ denotes the derivative of the vacuum polarization function with respect to q^{2}. The constant pieces of $\Pi_{\gamma\gamma}$ and $\Pi_{Z \gamma}$ are zero because of the renormalization conditions. We thus have six parameters to deal with. Three of these may be absorbed into the renormalization of the three input parameters of the electroweak theory, which are usually chosen to be the fine structure constant $\alpha$, as determined from quantum electrodynamic measurements (there is a significant running of α between the scale of the mass of the electron and the electroweak scale and this needs to be corrected for), the Fermi coupling constant G_{F}, as determined from the muon decay which measures the weak current coupling strength at close to zero momentum transfer, and the Z boson mass M_{Z}, leaving three left over which are measurable. This is because we are not able to determine which contribution comes from the Standard Model proper and which contribution comes from physics beyond the Standard Model (BSM) when measuring these three parameters. To us, the low energy processes could have equally well come from a pure Standard Model with redefined values of e, G_{F} and M_{Z}. These remaining three are the Peskin–Takeuchi parameters S, T and U, and are defined as:

$\alpha S = 4 s_w^2 c_w^2 \left[ \Pi_{ZZ}^{\prime}(0) - \frac{c_w^2 - s_w^2}{s_w c_w} \Pi_{Z \gamma}^{\prime}(0) - \Pi_{\gamma \gamma}^{\prime}(0) \right]$

$\alpha T = \frac{\Pi_{WW}(0)}{M_W^2} - \frac{\Pi_{ZZ}(0)}{M_Z^2}$

$\alpha U = 4 s_w^2 \left[ \Pi_{WW}^{\prime}(0) - c_w^2 \Pi_{ZZ}^{\prime}(0) - 2 s_w c_w \Pi_{Z \gamma}^{\prime}(0) - s_w^2 \Pi_{\gamma\gamma}^{\prime}(0) \right]$

where s_{w} and c_{w} are the sine and cosine of the weak mixing angle, respectively. The definitions are carefully chosen so that

1. Any BSM correction which is indistinguishable from a redefinition of e, G_{F} and M_{Z} (or equivalently, g_{1}, g_{2} and ν) in the Standard Model proper at the tree level does not contribute to S, T or U.
2. Assuming that the Higgs sector consists of electroweak doublet(s) H, the effective action term $\left|H^\dagger D_\mu H\right|^2/\Lambda^2$ only contributes to T and not to S or U. This term violates custodial symmetry.
3. Assuming that the Higgs sector consists of electroweak doublet(s) H, the effective action term $H^\dagger W^{\mu\nu}B_{\mu\nu}H/\Lambda^2$ only contributes to S and not to T or U. (The contribution of $H^\dagger B^{\mu\nu}B_{\mu\nu}H/\Lambda^2$ can be absorbed into g_{1} and the contribution of $H^\dagger W^{\mu\nu}W_{\mu\nu}H/\Lambda^2$ can be absorbed into g_{2}).
4. Assuming that the Higgs sector consists of electroweak doublet(s) H, the effective action term $\left(H^\dagger W^{\mu\nu}H\right)\left(H^\dagger W_{\mu\nu}H\right)/\Lambda^4$ contributes to U.

== Uses ==
- The S parameter measures the difference between the number of left-handed fermions and the number of right-handed fermions that carry weak isospin. It tightly constrains the allowable number of new fourth-generation chiral fermions. This is a problem for theories like the simplest version of technicolor (physics) that contain a large number of extra fermion doublets.
- The T parameter measures isospin violation, since it is sensitive to the difference between the loop corrections to the Z boson vacuum polarization function and the W boson vacuum polarization function. An example of isospin violation is the large mass splitting between the top quark and the bottom quark, which are isospin partners to each other and in the limit of isospin symmetry would have equal mass.
- The S and T parameters are both affected by varying the mass of the Higgs boson (recall that the zero point of S and T is defined relative to a reference value of the Standard Model Higgs mass). Before the Higgs-like boson was discovered at the LHC, experiments at the CERN LEP collider set a lower bound of 114 GeV on its mass. If we assume that the Standard Model is correct, a best fit value of the Higgs mass could be extracted from the S, T fit. The best fit was near the LEP lower bound, and the 95% confidence level upper bound was around 200 GeV. Thus the measured mass of 125-126 GeV fits comfortably in this prediction, suggesting the Standard Model may be a good description up to energies past the TeV ( = 1,000 GeV) scale.
- The U parameter tends not to be very useful in practice, because the contributions to U from most new physics models are very small. This is because U actually parameterizes the coefficient of a dimension-eight operator, while S and T can be represented as dimension-six operators.

== See also ==
- Parameterized post-Newtonian formalism - a similar parametrization in the gravitational context
