= Soler model =

Type of 3+1 dimensional quantum field theory

The soler model is a quantum field theory model of Dirac fermions interacting via four fermion interactions in 3 spatial and 1 time dimension. It was introduced in 1938 by Dmitri Ivanenko and re-introduced and investigated in 1970 by Mario Soler as a toy model of self-interacting electron.

This model is described by the Lagrangian density

$$\mathcal{L}=\overline{\psi} \left(i\partial\!\!\!/-m \right) \psi + \frac{g}{2}\left(\overline{\psi} \psi\right)^2$$

where $g$ is the coupling constant, $\partial\!\!\!/=\sum_{\mu=0}^3\gamma^\mu\frac{\partial}{\partial x^\mu}$ in the Feynman slash notations, $\overline{\psi}=\psi^*\gamma^0$. Here $\gamma^\mu$, $0\le\mu\le 3$, are Dirac gamma matrices.

The corresponding equation can be written as

$$i\frac{\partial}{\partial t}\psi=-i\sum_{j=1}^{3}\alpha^j\frac{\partial}{\partial x^j}\psi+m\beta\psi-g(\overline{\psi} \psi)\beta\psi$$,

where $\alpha^j$, $1\le j\le 3$, and $\beta$ are the Dirac matrices. In one dimension, this model is known as the massive Gross–Neveu model.

== Generalizations ==
A commonly considered generalization is

$$\mathcal{L}=\overline{\psi} \left(i\partial\!\!\!/-m \right) \psi + g\frac{\left(\overline{\psi} \psi\right)^{k+1}}{k+1}$$

with $k>0$, or even

$$\mathcal{L}=\overline{\psi} \left(i\partial\!\!\!/-m \right) \psi + F\left(\overline{\psi} \psi\right)$$,

where $F$ is a smooth function.

== Features ==
=== Internal symmetry ===
Besides the unitary symmetry U(1), in dimensions 1, 2, and 3 the equation has SU(1,1) global internal symmetry.

=== Renormalizability ===
The Soler model is renormalizable by the power counting for $k=1$ and in one dimension only, and non-renormalizable for higher values of $k$ and in higher dimensions.

=== Solitary wave solutions ===
The Soler model admits solitary wave solutions of the form $\phi(x)e^{-i\omega t},$ where $\phi$ is localized (becomes small when $x$ is large) and $\omega$ is a real number.

=== Reduction to the massive Thirring model ===
In spatial dimension 2, the Soler model coincides with the massive Thirring model, due to the relation $(\bar\psi\psi)^2=J_\mu J^\mu$, with $\bar\psi\psi=\psi^*\sigma_3\psi$ the relativistic scalar and $J^\mu=(\psi^*\psi,\psi^*\sigma_1\psi,\psi^*\sigma_2\psi)$ the charge-current density. The relation follows from the identity $(\psi^*\sigma_1\psi)^2+(\psi^*\sigma_2\psi)^2+(\psi^*\sigma_3\psi)^2 =(\psi^*\psi)^2$, for any $\psi\in\Complex^2$.

== See also ==
- Dirac equation
- Gross–Neveu model
- Nonlinear Dirac equation
- Thirring model
