= Correction =

Correction may refer to:

- A euphemism for punishment
- Correction (newspaper), the posting of a notice of a mistake in a past issue of a newspaper
- Correction (stock market), in financial markets, a short-term price decline
- Correction (novel), a 1975 novel by Thomas Bernhard
- a mechanism in mixed electoral systems also known as compensation
- a perturbation to an equation in perturbation theory (quantum mechanics)
  - radiative correction
    - oblique correction
    - nonoblique correction
  - loop correction

== See also ==
- Corrections (disambiguation)
- Corrector, a political/administrative office in classical Antiquity and some religions
