= Four-fermion interactions =

Point interactions with four fermions

In quantum field theory, fermions are described by anticommuting spinor fields. A four-fermion interaction describes a local interaction between four fermionic fields at a point in spacetime. A theory involving such an interaction might be an effective field theory or it might be fundamental.

In four spacetime dimensions, such theories are not renormalisable.

== Relativistic models ==
Some examples are the following:

- Fermi's theory of the weak interaction. The interaction term has a V − A (vector minus axial) form.
- The Gross–Neveu model. This is a four-fermi theory of Dirac fermions without chiral symmetry and as such, it may or may not be massive.
- The Thirring model. This is a four-fermi theory of fermions with a vector coupling.
- The Nambu–Jona-Lasinio model. This is a four-fermi theory of Dirac fermions with chiral symmetry and as such, it has no bare mass.

== Nonrelativistic models ==
A nonrelativistic example is the BCS theory at large length scales with the phonons integrated out so that the force between two dressed electrons is approximated by a contact term.

== See also ==
- Oblique correction
- Peskin–Takeuchi parameter
