= Elementary particle =

Subatomic particle having no substructure

In the Standard Model of particle physics, an elementary particle or fundamental particle is a subatomic particle that is not composed of other particles. The Standard Model recognizes seventeen distinct particles—twelve fermions and five bosons. As a consequence of flavor and color combinations and antimatter, the fermions and bosons are known to have 48 and 13 variations, respectively. These 61 elementary particles include electrons and other leptons, quarks, and the fundamental bosons. Subatomic particles such as protons or neutrons, which contain two or more elementary particles, are known as composite particles.

== History ==
The concept of an elementary particle is not based on measurements but instead depends on a theoretical framework. Ordinary matter is composed of atoms, themselves once thought to be indivisible elementary particles. The name atom comes from the Ancient Greek word ἄτομος (atomos) which means indivisible or uncuttable. Despite the theories about atoms that had existed for thousands of years, their factual existence remained controversial until 1905. In that year, Albert Einstein published his paper on Brownian motion, putting to rest theories that had regarded molecules as mathematical illusions. Einstein subsequently identified matter as ultimately composed of various concentrations of energy.

Subatomic constituents of the atom were first identified toward the end of the 19th century, beginning with the electron, followed by the proton in 1919, the photon in the 1920s, and the neutron in 1932. By that time, the advent of quantum mechanics had radically altered the definition of a "particle" by putting forward an understanding in which they carried out a simultaneous existence as matter waves.

Many theoretical elaborations upon, and beyond, the Standard Model have been made since its codification in the 1970s. These include notions of supersymmetry, which double the number of elementary particles by hypothesizing that each known particle associates with a "shadow" partner far more massive. However, like an additional elementary boson mediating gravitation, such superpartners remain undiscovered as of 2026.

== Overview ==
All elementary particles are either fermions or bosons. These classes are distinguished by their quantum statistics: fermions obey Fermi–Dirac statistics and bosons obey Bose–Einstein statistics. Their spin is differentiated via the spin–statistics theorem: it is half-integer for fermions, and integer for bosons.

Elementary particles
Elementary fermionsHalf-integer spinObey the Fermi–Dirac statistics	Elementary bosonsInteger spinObey the Bose–Einstein statistics
Quarks and antiquarksSpin = 1/2Fractional electric chargeHave color chargeParticipate in both strong interactions and in electroweak interactions	Leptons and antileptonsSpin = 1/2Integer electric chargeNo color chargeParticipate in Electroweak interactions	Gauge bosonsSpin = 1, 2^{[‡]}Force carriers	Scalar bosonsSpin = 0
Three generations: 1. Up (u), Down (d); 2. Charm (c), Strange (s); 3. Top (t), Bottom (b)	Three generations: 1. Electron (e^{−}),^{[†]} Electron neutrino (ν_{e}); 2. Muon (μ^{−}), Muon neutrino (ν_{μ}); 3. Tau (τ^{−}), Tau neutrino (ν_{τ})	Four kinds: 1. Photon (γ; electromagnetic interaction); 2. W and Z bosons (W^{+}, W^{−}, Z^{0}; weak interaction); 3. Eight types of gluons (g; strong interaction); 4. Graviton (hypothetical) (G; gravity)^{[‡]}	One kind Higgs boson (H^{0})

Notes:
[†] An anti-electron (e^{+}) is conventionally called a "positron".
[‡] The known force carrier bosons all have spin = 1. The hypothetical graviton has spin = 2; it is unknown whether it is a gauge boson as well.

In the Standard Model, elementary particles are represented for predictive utility as point particles. Though extremely successful, the Standard Model is limited by its omission of gravitation and has some parameters arbitrarily added but unexplained.

== Cosmic abundance of elementary particles ==
According to the current models of Big Bang nucleosynthesis, the primordial composition of visible matter of the universe should be about 75% hydrogen and 25% helium-4 (in mass). Neutrons are made of one up and two down quarks, while protons are made of two up and one down quark. Since the other common elementary particles (such as electrons, neutrinos, or weak bosons) are so light or so rare when compared to atomic nuclei, we can neglect their mass contribution to the observable universe's total mass. Therefore, one can conclude that most of the visible mass of the universe consists of protons and neutrons, which, like all baryons, in turn consist of up quarks and down quarks.

Some estimates imply that there are roughly 10^{80} baryons (almost entirely protons and neutrons) in the observable universe.

The number of protons in the observable universe is called the Eddington number.

In terms of number of particles, some estimates imply that nearly all the matter, excluding dark matter, occurs in neutrinos, which constitute the majority of the roughly 10^{86} elementary particles of matter that exist in the visible universe. Other estimates imply that roughly 10^{97} elementary particles exist in the visible universe (not including dark matter), mostly photons and other massless force carriers.

== Standard Model ==
The Standard Model of particle physics contains 12 flavors of elementary fermions, plus their corresponding antiparticles, as well as elementary bosons that mediate the forces and the Higgs boson, which was reported on July 4, 2012, as having been likely detected by the two main experiments at the Large Hadron Collider (ATLAS and CMS). The Standard Model is widely considered to be a provisional theory rather than a truly fundamental one, however, since it is not known if it is compatible with Einstein's general relativity. There may be hypothetical elementary particles not described by the Standard Model, such as the graviton, the particle that would carry the gravitational force, and sparticles, supersymmetric partners of the ordinary particles.

=== Fundamental fermions ===
The 12 fundamental fermions are divided into 3 generations of 4 particles each. Half of the fermions are leptons, three of which have an electric charge of −1 e, called the electron (e^{−}), the muon (μ^{−}), and the tau (τ^{−}); the other three leptons are neutrinos (ν_{e}, ν_{μ}, ν_{τ}), which are the only elementary fermions with neither electric nor color charge. The remaining six particles are quarks (discussed below).

==== Generations ====
Particle generations
Leptons
First generation		Second generation		Third generation	
Name	Symbol	Name	Symbol	Name	Symbol
electron	e^{−}	muon	μ^{−}	tau	τ^{−}
electron neutrino	ν_{e}	muon neutrino	ν_{μ}	tau neutrino	ν_{τ}
Quarks
First generation		Second generation		Third generation	
up quark	u	charm quark	c	top quark	t
down quark	d	strange quark	s	bottom quark	b

==== Mass ====
The following table lists current measured masses and mass estimates for all the fermions, using the same scale of measure: millions of electron-volts relative to square of light speed (MeV/c^{2}). For example, the most accurately known quark mass is of the top quark (t) at 172.7 GeV/c^{2}, estimated using the on-shell scheme.

Current values for elementary fermion masses
Particle symbol	Particle name	Mass value	Quark mass estimation scheme (point)
ν_{e}, ν_{μ}, ν_{τ}	Neutrino (any type)	< 0.8 eV/c^{2}	
e^{−}	electron	0.511 MeV/c^{2}	
u	up quark	1.9 MeV/c^{2}	MSbar scheme (μ_{M̅S̅} = 2 GeV)
d	down quark	4.4 MeV/c^{2}	MSbar scheme (μ_{M̅S̅} = 2 GeV)
s	strange quark	87 MeV/c^{2}	MSbar scheme (μ_{M̅S̅} = 2 GeV)
μ^{−}	muon (mu lepton)	105.7 MeV/c^{2}	
c	charm quark	1320 MeV/c^{2}	MSbar scheme (μ_{M̅S̅} = m_{c})
τ^{−}	tauon (tau lepton)	1780 MeV/c^{2}	
b	bottom quark	4240 MeV/c^{2}	MSbar scheme (μ_{M̅S̅} = m_{b})
t	top quark	172700 MeV/c^{2}	On-shell scheme

Estimates of the values of quark masses depend on the version of quantum chromodynamics used to describe quark interactions. Quarks are always confined in an envelope of gluons that confer vastly greater mass to the mesons and baryons where quarks occur, so values for quark masses cannot be measured directly. Since their masses are so small compared to the effective mass of the surrounding gluons, slight differences in the calculation make large differences in the masses.

==== Antiparticles ====
There are also 12 fundamental fermionic antiparticles that correspond to these 12 particles. For example, the antielectron (positron) e^{+} is the electron's antiparticle and has an electric charge of +1 e.

Particle generations
Antileptons
First generation		Second generation		Third generation	
Name	Symbol	Name	Symbol	Name	Symbol
positron	e^{+}	antimuon	μ^{+}	antitau	τ^{+}
electron antineutrino	ν̅_{e}	muon antineutrino	ν̅_{μ}	tau antineutrino	ν̅_{τ}
Antiquarks
First generation		Second generation		Third generation	
up antiquark	u̅	charm antiquark	c̅	top antiquark	t̅
down antiquark	d̅	strange antiquark	s̅	bottom antiquark	b̅

==== Quarks ====
Isolated quarks and antiquarks have never been detected, a fact explained by confinement. Every quark carries one of three color charges of the strong interaction; antiquarks similarly carry anticolor. Color-charged particles interact via gluon exchange in the same way that charged particles interact via photon exchange. Gluons are themselves color-charged, however, resulting in an amplification of the strong force as color-charged particles are separated. Unlike the electromagnetic force, which diminishes as charged particles separate, color-charged particles feel increasing force.

Nonetheless, color-charged particles may combine to form color neutral composite particles called hadrons. A quark may pair up with an antiquark: the quark has a color and the antiquark has the corresponding anticolor. The color and anticolor cancel out, forming a color neutral meson. Alternatively, three quarks can exist together, one quark being "red", another "blue", another "green". These three colored quarks together form a color-neutral baryon. Symmetrically, three antiquarks with the colors "antired", "antiblue" and "antigreen" can form a color-neutral antibaryon.

Quarks also carry fractional electric charges, but, since they are confined within hadrons whose charges are all integral, fractional charges have never been isolated. Note that quarks have electric charges of either + 2/3 e or − 1/3 e, whereas antiquarks have corresponding electric charges of either − 2/3 e or + 1/3 e.

Evidence for the existence of quarks comes from deep inelastic scattering: firing electrons at nuclei to determine the distribution of charge within nucleons (which are baryons). If the charge is uniform, the electric field around the proton should be uniform and the electron should scatter elastically. Low-energy electrons do scatter in this way, but, above a particular energy, the protons deflect some electrons through large angles. The recoiling electron has much less energy and a jet of particles is emitted. This inelastic scattering suggests that the charge in the proton is not uniform but split among smaller charged particles: quarks.

=== Fundamental bosons ===
In the Standard Model, vector (spin-1) bosons (gluons, photons, and the W and Z bosons) mediate forces, whereas the Higgs boson (spin-0) is responsible for the intrinsic mass of particles. Bosons differ from fermions in the fact that multiple bosons can occupy the same quantum state (Pauli exclusion principle). Also, bosons can be either elementary, like photons, or a combination, like mesons. The spin of bosons are integers instead of half integers.

==== Gluons ====
Gluons mediate the strong interaction, which join quarks and thereby form hadrons, which are either baryons (three quarks) or mesons (one quark and one antiquark). Protons and neutrons are baryons, joined by gluons to form the atomic nucleus. Like quarks, gluons exhibit color and anticolor – unrelated to the concept of visual color and rather the particles' strong interactions – sometimes in combinations, altogether eight variations of gluons.

==== Electroweak bosons ====
There are three weak gauge bosons: W^{+}, W^{−}, and Z^{0}; these mediate the weak interaction. The W bosons are known for their mediation in nuclear decay: The W^{−} converts a neutron into a proton then decays into an electron and electron-antineutrino pair. The Z^{0} does not convert particle flavor or charges, but rather changes momentum; it is the only mechanism for elastically scattering neutrinos. The weak gauge bosons were discovered due to momentum change in electrons from neutrino-Z exchange. The massless photon mediates the electromagnetic interaction. These four gauge bosons form the electroweak interaction among elementary particles.

==== Higgs boson ====
Although the weak and electromagnetic forces appear quite different to us at everyday energies, the two forces are theorized to unify as a single electroweak force at high energies. This prediction was clearly confirmed by measurements of cross-sections for high-energy electron-proton scattering at the HERA collider at DESY. The differences at low energies is a consequence of the high masses of the W and Z bosons, which in turn are a consequence of the Higgs mechanism. Through the process of spontaneous symmetry breaking, the Higgs selects a special direction in electroweak space that causes three electroweak particles to become very heavy (the weak bosons) and one to remain with an undefined rest mass as it is always in motion (the photon). On 4 July 2012, after many years of experimentally searching for evidence of its existence, the Higgs boson was announced to have been observed at CERN's Large Hadron Collider. Peter Higgs who first posited the existence of the Higgs boson was present at the announcement. The Higgs boson is believed to have a mass of approximately 125 GeV/c^{2}. The statistical significance of this discovery was reported as 5 sigma, which implies a certainty of roughly 99.99994%. In particle physics, this is the level of significance required to officially label experimental observations as a discovery. Research into the properties of the particle continues.

== Beyond the Standard Model ==
Although experimental evidence overwhelmingly confirms the Standard Model's predictions, some aspects of the theory remain poorly understood, such as the reason for the extremely large discrepancy between the weak force and gravity (an aspect of the hierarchy problem). A further issue is the fact that several of the parameters of the theory were introduced ad hoc rather than emerging naturally from an underlying physical explanation. Theories beyond the Standard Model attempt to resolve these perceived shortcomings.

=== Graviton ===
The graviton is a hypothetical elementary spin-2 particle proposed to mediate gravitation. While it remains undiscovered due to the difficulty inherent in its detection, it is sometimes included in tables of elementary particles. The conventional graviton is massless, although some models containing massive Kaluza–Klein gravitons exist.

=== Grand unification ===
One extension of the Standard Model attempts to combine the electroweak interaction with the strong interaction into a single 'grand unified theory' (GUT). Such a force would be spontaneously broken into the three forces by a Higgs-like mechanism. This breakdown is theorized to occur at high energies, making it difficult to observe unification in a laboratory. The most dramatic prediction of grand unification is the existence of X and Y bosons, which cause proton decay. The non-observation of proton decay at the Super-Kamiokande neutrino observatory rules out the simplest GUTs, however, including SU(5) and SO(10).

=== Supersymmetry ===
Supersymmetry extends the Standard Model by adding another class of symmetries to the Lagrangian. These symmetries exchange fermionic particles with bosonic ones. Such a symmetry predicts the existence of supersymmetric particles, abbreviated as sparticles, which include the sleptons, squarks, neutralinos, and charginos. Each particle in the Standard Model would have a superpartner whose spin differs by 1/2 from the ordinary particle. Due to the breaking of supersymmetry, the sparticles are much heavier than their ordinary counterparts; they are so heavy that existing particle colliders would not be powerful enough to produce them. Some physicists believe that sparticles will be detected by the Large Hadron Collider at CERN.

=== String theory ===
String theory is a model of physics whereby all "particles" that make up matter are composed of strings (measuring at the Planck length) that exist in an 11-dimensional (according to M-theory, the leading version) or 12-dimensional (according to F-theory) universe. These strings vibrate at different frequencies that determine mass, electric charge, color charge, and spin. A "string" can be open (a line) or closed in a loop (a one-dimensional sphere, that is, a circle). As a string moves through space it sweeps out something called a world sheet. String theory predicts 1- to 10-branes (a 1-brane being a string and a 10-brane being a 10-dimensional object) that prevent tears in the "fabric" of space using the uncertainty principle (e.g., the electron orbiting a hydrogen atom has the probability, albeit small, that it could be anywhere else in the universe at any given moment).

String theory proposes that our universe is merely a 4-brane, inside which exist the three space dimensions and the one time dimension that we observe. The remaining 7 theoretical dimensions either are very tiny and curled up (and too small to be macroscopically accessible) or simply do not/cannot exist in our universe (because they exist in a grander scheme called the "multiverse" outside our known universe).

Some predictions of the string theory include the existence of extremely massive counterparts of ordinary particles due to vibrational excitations of the fundamental string and existence of a massless spin-2 particle behaving like the graviton.

=== Technicolor ===
Technicolor theories try to modify the Standard Model in a minimal way by introducing a new QCD-like interaction. This means one adds a new theory of so-called Techniquarks, interacting via so called Technigluons. The main idea is that the Higgs boson is not an elementary particle but a bound state of these objects.

=== Preon theory ===
According to preon theory there are one or more orders of particles more fundamental than those (or most of those) found in the Standard Model. The most fundamental of these are normally called preons, which is derived from "pre-quarks". In essence, preon theory tries to do for the Standard Model what the Standard Model did for the particle zoo that came before it. Most models assume that almost everything in the Standard Model can be explained in terms of three to six more fundamental particles and the rules that govern their interactions. Interest in preons has waned since the simplest models were experimentally ruled out in the 1980s.

=== Acceleron theory ===
Accelerons are the hypothetical subatomic particles that integrally link the newfound mass of the neutrino to the dark energy conjectured to be accelerating the expansion of the universe.

In this theory, neutrinos are influenced by a new force resulting from their interactions with accelerons, leading to dark energy. Dark energy results as the universe tries to pull neutrinos apart. Accelerons are thought to interact with matter more infrequently than they do with neutrinos.

== See also ==
- Asymptotic freedom
- List of particles
- Physical ontology
- Quantum field theory
- Quantum gravity
- Quantum triviality
- UV fixed point
- Periodic table
