= Pole mass =

Limiting rest mass of a particle at high energies in quantum field theory

In quantum field theory, the pole mass of an elementary particle is the limiting value of the rest mass of a particle as the energy scale of measurement increases.

== Running mass ==
In quantum field theory, quantities like coupling constant and mass "run" with the energy scale of high energy physics. The running mass of a fermion or massive boson depends on the energy scale at which the observation occurs, in a way described by a renormalization group equation (RGE) and calculated by a renormalization scheme such as the on-shell scheme or the minimal subtraction scheme. The running mass refers to a Lagrangian parameter whose value changes with the energy scale at which the renormalization scheme is applied. A calculation, typically done by a computerized algorithm and is intractable by paper calculations, relates the running mass to the pole mass. The algorithm typically relies on a perturbative calculation of the self energy.

== See also ==
- Bare mass
- Relativistic Breit–Wigner distribution
- Infraparticle
