= Carlos Guido Bollini =

Argentinian theoretical physicist

- Born: January 15, 1926; Lomas de Zamora, Buenos Aires, Argentina
- Died: October 12, 2009 (aged 83); Ciudad Autónoma de Buenos Aires, Argentina
- Education: Universidad Nacional de La Plata (PhD)
- Known for: Dimensional regularization

Carlos Guido Bollini (15 January 1926 - 12 October 2009) was a physicist from Argentina. He is known for being one of the driving forces behind the development of physics in his country and for developing, together with Juan José Giambiagi, the method of dimensional regularization, which is used nowadays in high-energy physics.

== Biography ==
Bollini was born in Lomas de Zamora in 1926. He went to the industrial high-school Ingeniero Huergo and, afterwards, he continued his studies at the Universidad Nacional de La Plata. He obtained his degree in physics and, in 1953, he was awarded the title of Doctor en Ciencias Fisicomatemáticas (PhD in mathematical physics). After obtaining his PhD, he worked as teaching assistant at the Facultad de Ciencias Exactas y Naturales de la Universidad de Buenos Aires. Subsequently, he lived a few months in Bariloche, where he was a teacher at the Instituto Balseiro.

Between 1958 and 1960 he was a fellow of the CONICET at the Imperial College of Science and Technology. There, he spent two year working under the supervision of Nobel prize Abdus Salam.

He came back to the country to become professor at the Physics Department of the Facultad de Ciencias Exactas, Universidad de Buenos Aires. In 1969 he was one of the 300 researchers that had to quit their positions at the Universidad de Buenos Aires after the Noche de los Bastones Largos (night of the long truncheons). At that time, he moved to the city of La Plata, where he worked at the Physics Department of the Universidad Nacional de La Plata.

His most cited contribution was published in 1972 in collaboration with Juan José Giambiagi. This work is related to the method of dimensional regularization, a method used in the renormalization of quantum field theories. The same idea was developed in parallel by a group of Dutch researchers (Gerardus 't Hooft and Martinus J. G. Veltman). Even though Bollini and Giambagi were the first to submit their work, the manuscript was rejected by Physics Letters B, so they decided to send it to Il Nuovo Cimento B; in the meanwhile, the manuscript of the Dutch researchers got published in Nuclear Physics B. The Dutch group was later awarded the Nobel Prize in 1999, partially for this publication. The work of Giambiagi and Bollini was not cited in the Royal Swedish Academy of Science's advanced-information article. However, Veltman admitted to having seen drafts of Giambiagi and Bollini's work and mentioned “the independent work of Bollini and Giambiagi,” in his Nobel lecture.

In 1976 he had to leave Argentina, after a series of events triggered by the military coup d'état. First, in October 1976 he received a letter from the military then in charge of the Universidad de La Plata, saying that they no longer needed his services as professor. Second, in November 1976, he received a similar letter from CONICET. Afterwards, in the middle of one night, he and his family were awakened by the strike of a paramilitary force at their house; they were forced to stay in pijamas in the middle of the street, while their house was searched. After these events, he decided to emigrate from Argentina, initially hired by the Instituto de Física Teórica in São Paulo, Brazil, and afterwards by the Centro Brasileiro de Pesquisas Físicas in Rio do Janeiro.

He came back to Argentina in 1984, when the Comisión de Investigaciones de la Provincia de Buenos Aires (Research Commission of the Buenos Aires province) offered him the position of researcher. He was also researcher at the Comisión Nacional de Energía Atómica (National Atomic Energy Commission), where he worked as leader of the Division of Theoretical Physics and of the Theory Group of the Reactor. In addition, he was full Professor at the Instituto de Física de San Carlos de Bariloche (Instituto Balseiro).

== Awards and honors ==
- 2003 Platinum Konex award in physics.
- 1993 Konex award in physics and astronomy.
- 1987 Bunge y Born award for his track.
- 1987 Richard Gans prize for his track.
- 1975 Dr. Teófilo Isnardi award by the National Academy of Sciences of Argentina (Academia Nacional de Ciencias).
