= Gross–Neveu model =

Toy model in quantum field theory

The Gross–Neveu model (GN) is a quantum field theory model of Dirac fermions interacting via a four-fermion interactions. It was introduced in 1974 by David Gross and André Neveu as a toy model for quantum chromodynamics (QCD), the theory describing the strong interaction. In 1 spatial and 1 time dimension, the Gross–Neveu shares several properties with QCD: First, it is asymptotically free, as the effective interaction strength decreases with increasing energy. Second, the theory has a dynamical mass generation mechanism with $\mathbb{Z}_2$ chiral symmetry breaking.

It is made using a finite, but possibly large number, $\ N\ ,$ of Dirac fermion wave functions $\psi_1, \psi_2, \ldots, \psi_N$, indexed below by Latin letter $\ a ~.$

The model's Lagrangian density is

$$\mathcal{L}=\bar \psi_a \left( i\ \partial\!\!\!/\ -\ m \right) \psi^a\ +\ \frac{\ g^2 }{\ 2\ N\ }\left[ \bar\psi_a\ \psi^a \right]^2\ ,$$

where the formula uses Einstein summation notation. Each wave function $\ \psi^a\$ is a two component (left / right) spinor and $\ g\$ is the interaction's coupling constant. If the mass $\ m\$ is zero, the model is chiral symmetric type, otherwise, for non-zero mass, it is classical mass type.

This model has a U(N) global internal symmetry. If one takes $\ N = 1\$ (which permits only one quartic interaction) and makes no attempt to analytically continue the dimension, the model reduces to the massive Thirring model (which is completely integrable).

It is a 2 dimensional version of the 4 dimensional Nambu–Jona-Lasinio model (NJL), which was introduced 14 years earlier as a model of dynamical chiral symmetry breaking (but no quark confinement) modeled upon the BCS theory of superconductivity. The 2 dimensional version has the advantage that the 4 fermi interaction is renormalizable, which it is not in any higher number of dimensions.

== Features of the theory ==
Gross and Neveu studied this model in the large $\ N\$ limit, expanding the relevant parameters in a $\tfrac{ 1 }{\ N\ }\$ expansion. After demonstrating that this and related models are asymptotically free, they found that, in the subleading order, for small fermion masses the bifermion condensate $\ \overline{\psi}_a\ \psi^a\$ acquires a vacuum expectation value (VEV) and as a result the fundamental fermions become massive. They find that the mass is not analytic in the coupling constant $\ g ~.$ The vacuum expectation value spontaneously breaks the chiral symmetry of the theory.

More precisely, expanding about the vacuum with no vacuum expectation value for the bilinear condensate they found a tachyon. To do this they solve the renormalization group equations for the propagator of the bifermion field, using the fact that the only renormalization of the coupling constant comes from the wave function renormalization of the composite field. They then calculated, at leading order in a $\tfrac{ 1 }{\ N\ }\$ expansion but to all orders in the coupling constant, the dependence of the potential energy on the condensate using the effective action techniques introduced the previous year by Sidney Coleman at the Erice International Summer School of Physics. They found that this potential is minimized at a nonzero value of the condensate, indicating that this is the true value of the condensate. Expanding the theory about the new vacuum, the tachyon was found to be no longer present and in fact, like the BCS theory of superconductivity, there is a mass gap.

They then made a number of general arguments about dynamical mass generation in quantum field theories. For example, they demonstrated that not all masses may be dynamically generated in theories which are infrared-stable, using this to argue that, at least to leading order in $\tfrac{ 1 }{\ N\ }\$ the 4 dimensional $\ \phi^4\$ theory does not exist. They also argued that in asymptotically free theories the dynamically generated masses never depend analytically on the coupling constants.

== Generalizations ==
Gross and Neveu considered several generalizations. First, they considered a Lagrangian with one extra quartic interaction

$$\mathcal{L} = \bar\psi_a \left(i\ \partial\!\!\!/\ -\ m \right) \psi^a\ +\ \frac{\ g^2}{\ 2\ N\ } (\left[ \bar\psi_a\ \psi^a \right]^2\ -\ \left[ \bar\psi_a\ \gamma_5\ \psi^a\right]^2)$$

chosen so that the discrete chiral symmetry $\ \psi \mapsto \gamma_5 \psi\$ of the original model is enhanced to a continuous U(1)-valued chiral symmetry $\psi\rightarrow e^{i\theta\gamma_5}\psi ~.$ Chiral symmetry breaking occurs as before, caused by the same VEV. However, as the spontaneously broken symmetry is now continuous, a massless Goldstone boson appears in the spectrum. Although this leads to no problems at the leading order in the $\tfrac{ 1 }{\ N\ }\$ expansion, massless particles in 2 dimensional quantum field theories inevitably lead to infrared divergences, and so there appears to be no such theory.

Two further modifications of the modified theory, which remedy this problem, were then considered. In one modification one increases the number of dimensions. As a result, the massless field does not lead to divergences. In the other modification, the chiral symmetry is gauged. Consequently, the Golstone boson is "eaten" by the Higgs mechanism as the photon becomes massive, and so does not lead to any divergences.

== See also ==
- Dirac equation
- Nonlinear Dirac equation
- Thirring model
- Nambu–Jona-Lasinio model
