= Bare particle =

Excitation of a quantum field

A bare particle is an excitation of an elementary quantum field in theoretical physics; in solid-state physics and particle physics, it becomes a dressed particle when it includes the additional particles surrounding it, often described as a quasiparticle in condensed-matter systems.

In the context of quantum field theory, bare particles are theoretical entities whose properties, such as bare mass and bare charge, are defined in the absence of interactions with their own fields. In renormalization theory, these parameters often differ from physical (observed) values because of the "cloud" of the virtual particles surrounding the particle.

== History ==
Hendrik Kramers first suggested in 1947 that the mass of a particle should be split into two parts which are a "bare" mechanical mass and an electromagnetic mass generated by the particle's own field. Hans Bethe applied this logic shortly after to explain the Lamb shift, performing the first non-relativistic "renormalization" by subtracting the infinite energy of a bare electron from its observed state.

In Abraham–Lorentz model, an electron was often imagined as a tiny charged sphere. Because the electron carries an electric charge, it generates an electric field; however, that same field must then exert a self-force (force acting back on the electron). Calculations showed that this "self-interaction" contributed an additional amount of inertia to the particle, effectively acting as an electromagnetic mass. This led to the early conceptual split between the "mechanical mass" (the inherent, or bare mass of the sphere) and the observed mass, which was the sum of the mechanical and electromagnetic components. But this model faced a critical logical hurdle: if the electron were a true point particle with zero radius, the energy of its own electric field would become infinite. To keep the observed mass finite, physicists had to assume the electron had a specific physical size (the classical electron radius) or suggest that the bare mechanical mass was actually negative to cancel out the infinite field energy, a notion that was mathematically necessary but physically difficult to justify.

While the Abraham–Lorentz approach could not fully resolve these infinities, it established the fundamental principle that the properties we measure in a laboratory are not just those of a "naked" particle, but a combination of the particle and its surrounding field. This distinction provided the conceptual foundation for Kramers and Bethe to later develop the quantum version of renormalization in the 1940s.

== Theoretical definition ==
A bare particle is defined by the fundamental parameters of a quantum field theory before considering the self-interactions and vacuum fluctuations that characterize a physical, dressed particle. These parameters, such as the bare mass ($m_0$) and bare charge ($e_0$), are the raw coefficients appearing in the Lagrangian density of the system. For a fermion in quantum electrodynamics (QED), the interaction is described by:

$$\mathcal{L} = \bar{\psi}(i\gamma^\mu D_{\mu} - m_0)\psi - \frac{1}{4} F_{\mu\nu} F^{\mu\nu}$$

In this equation, $m_0$ represents the mass the particle would have if it could be completely isolated from its own electromagnetic field. This quantity is not directly accessible to experiment; rather, the mass measured in a laboratory is the "physical mass", which is the sum of the bare mass and the energy associated with the particle's interaction with the surrounding vacuum. Because the self-energy of a point-like particle often results in mathematical divergences, the bare mass is frequently treated as an infinite quantity that cancels out these singular terms during the process of renormalization.

== See also ==
- Dressed particle
- Quasiparticle
- Renormalization
