= Oblique correction =

In particle physics, an oblique correction refers to a particular type of radiative correction to the electroweak sector of the Standard Model. Oblique corrections are defined in four-fermion scattering processes, (e^{+} + e^{−} → q + q̅ ) at the CERN Large Electron–Positron Collider. There are three classes of radiative corrections to these processes: vacuum polarization corrections, vertex corrections, and box corrections. The vacuum polarization corrections are referred to as oblique corrections, since they only affect the mixing and propagation of the gauge bosons and they do not depend on which type of fermions appear in the initial or final states. (The vertex and box corrections, which depend on the identity of the initial and final state fermions, are called nonoblique corrections.)

Any new particles charged under the electroweak gauge groups can contribute to oblique corrections. Therefore, the oblique corrections can be used to constrain possible new physics beyond the Standard Model. To affect the nonoblique corrections, on the other hand, the new particles must couple directly to the external fermions.

The oblique corrections are usually parameterized in terms of the Peskin–Takeuchi parameters S, T, and U.

== See also ==
- Initial and final state radiation
