= Custodial symmetry =

Remnant symmetry after spontaneous symmetry breaking

In particle physics, a symmetry that remains after spontaneous symmetry breaking that can prevent higher-order radiative corrections from spoiling some property of a theory is called a custodial symmetry.

== Motivation ==
In the Standard Model of particle physics, the custodial symmetry is a residual global SU(2) symmetry of the Higgs potential $V_{SM} = -\mu (H^\dagger H) - \lambda(H^\dagger H)^2$ beyond the basic SU(2)×U(1) gauge symmetry of the Weak Interaction, that prevents higher-order radiative-corrections from driving the Standard Model parameter $\rho$ away from ≈ 1 after spontaneous symmetry breaking. (Note: $\rho$ is a ratio involving the masses of the weak bosons and the Weinberg angle).

With one or more electroweak Higgs doublets in the Higgs sector, the effective action term $\left|H^\dagger D_\mu H\right|^2/\Lambda^2$ which generically arises with physics beyond the Standard Model at the scale Λ contributes to the Peskin–Takeuchi parameter T.

Current precision electroweak measurements restrict Λ to more than a few TeV. Attempts to solve the gauge hierarchy problem generically require the addition of new particles below that scale, however.

== What is custodial symmetry? ==
Before electroweak symmetry breaking there was a global SU(2)xSU(2) symmetry in the Higgs potential, which is broken to just SU(2) after electroweak symmetry breaking. This remnant symmetry is called custodial symmetry. The total standard model lagrangian would be custodial symmetric if the Yukawa couplings are the same, i.e. Yu=Yd and hypercharge coupling is zero. It is very important to see beyond the standard model effect by including new terms which violate custodial symmetry.

== Construction ==
The preferred way of preventing the $\left|H^\dagger D_\mu H\right|^2/\Lambda^2$ term from being generated is to introduce an approximate symmetry which acts upon the Higgs sector. In addition to the gauged SU(2)_{W} which acts exactly upon the Higgs doublets, we will also introduce another approximate global SU(2)_{R} symmetry which also acts upon the Higgs doublet. The Higgs doublet is now a real representation (2,2) of SU(2)_{L} × SU(2)_{R} with four real components. Here, we have relabeled W as L following the standard convention. ("L" stand for "Left", both because the Weak interaction only couples to the "Left-Handed" components of the fermion degrees of freedom, and also because SU(2)_{L} acts on the Higgs matrix $H$ from the left; contrawise, SU(2)_{R} acts on $H$ from the right.) Such a symmetry will not forbid Higgs kinetic terms like $D^\mu H^\dagger D_\mu H$ or tachyonic mass terms like $H^\dagger H$ or self-coupling terms like $\left(H^\dagger H\right)^2$ (fortunately!) but will prevent $\left|H^\dagger D_\mu H\right|^2/\Lambda^2$.

Such an SU(2)_{R} symmetry can never be exact and unbroken because otherwise, the up-type and the down-type Yukawa couplings will be exactly identical. SU(2)_{R} does not map the hypercharge symmetry U(1)_{Y} to itself but the hypercharge gauge coupling strength is small and in the limit as it goes to zero, we won't have a problem. U(1)_{Y} is said to be weakly gauged and this explicitly breaks SU(2)_{R}.

After the Higgs doublet acquires a nonzero vacuum expectation value, the (approximate) SU(2)_{L} × SU(2)_{R} symmetry is spontaneously broken to the (approximate) diagonal subgroup SU(2)_{V}. This approximate symmetry is called the custodial symmetry.

== See also ==
- Peskin–Takeuchi parameter
- left-right model
- little Higgs
