= Nonlinear Dirac equation =

Dirac equation for self-interacting fermions

See Ricci calculus and Van der Waerden notation for the notation.

In quantum field theory, the nonlinear Dirac equation is a model of self-interacting Dirac fermions. This model is widely considered in quantum physics as a toy model of self-interacting electrons.

The nonlinear Dirac equation appears in the Einstein–Cartan–Sciama–Kibble theory of gravity, which extends general relativity to matter with intrinsic angular momentum (spin). This theory removes a constraint of the symmetry of the affine connection and treats its antisymmetric part, the torsion tensor, as a variable in varying the action. In the resulting field equations, the torsion tensor is a homogeneous, linear function of the spin tensor. The minimal coupling between torsion and Dirac spinors thus generates an axial-axial, spin–spin interaction in fermionic matter, which becomes significant only at extremely high densities. Consequently, the Dirac equation becomes nonlinear (cubic) in the spinor field, which causes fermions to be spatially extended and may remove the ultraviolet divergence in quantum field theory.

== Models ==
Two common examples are the massive Thirring model and the Soler model.

=== Thirring model ===
The Thirring model was originally formulated as a model in (1 + 1) space-time dimensions and is characterized by the Lagrangian density

$$\mathcal{L}= \overline{\psi}(i\partial\!\!\!/-m)\psi -\frac{g}{2}\left(\overline{\psi}\gamma^\mu\psi\right) \left(\overline{\psi}\gamma_\mu \psi\right),$$

where ψ ∈ C^{2} is the spinor field, ψ̅ = ψ*γ^{0} is the Dirac adjoint spinor,

$$\partial\!\!\!/=\sum_{\mu=0,1}\gamma^\mu\frac{\partial}{\partial x^\mu}\,,$$

(Feynman slash notation is used), g is the coupling constant, m is the mass, and γ^{μ} are the two-dimensional gamma matrices, finally μ = 0, 1 is an index.

=== Soler model ===
The Soler model was originally formulated in (3 + 1) space-time dimensions. It is characterized by the Lagrangian density

$$\mathcal{L} = \overline{\psi} \left(i\partial\!\!\!/-m \right) \psi + \frac{g}{2} \left(\overline{\psi} \psi\right)^2,$$

using the same notations above, except

$$\partial\!\!\!/=\sum_{\mu=0}^3\gamma^\mu\frac{\partial}{\partial x^\mu}\,,$$

is now the four-gradient operator contracted with the four-dimensional Dirac gamma matrices γ^{μ}, so therein μ = 0, 1, 2, 3.

Recently, exact solutions in closed form were found for the Soler model.

== Einstein–Cartan theory ==
In Einstein–Cartan theory the Lagrangian density for a Dirac spinor field is given by ($c = \hbar = 1$)

$$\mathcal{L} = \sqrt{-g} \left(\overline{\psi} \left(i\gamma^\mu D_\mu-m \right) \psi\right),$$

where

$$D_\mu=\partial_\mu + \frac{1}{4}\omega_{\nu\rho\mu}\gamma^\nu \gamma^\rho$$

is the Fock–Ivanenko covariant derivative of a spinor with respect to the affine connection, $\omega_{\mu\nu\rho}$ is the spin connection, $g$ is the determinant of the metric tensor $g_{\mu\nu}$, and the Dirac matrices satisfy

$$\gamma^\mu \gamma^\nu + \gamma^\nu \gamma^\mu = 2g^{\mu\nu}I.$$

The Einstein–Cartan field equations for the spin connection yield an algebraic constraint between the spin connection and the spinor field rather than a partial differential equation, which allows the spin connection to be explicitly eliminated from the theory. The final result is a nonlinear Dirac equation containing an effective "spin-spin" self-interaction,

$$i\gamma^\mu D_\mu \psi - m\psi = i\gamma^\mu \nabla_\mu \psi + \frac{3\kappa}{8} \left(\overline{\psi}\gamma_\mu\gamma^5\psi\right) \gamma^\mu \gamma^5\psi - m\psi = 0,$$

where $\nabla_\mu$ is the general-relativistic covariant derivative of a spinor, and $\kappa$ is the Einstein gravitational constant, $\frac{8 \pi G}{c^4}$. The cubic term in this equation becomes significant at densities on the order of $\frac{m^2}{\kappa}$.

In a more general theory in which torsion is propagating, when torsion is taken in the effective approximation, the non-linearity in the Dirac equation will have the same structure, but with the constant $\frac{3\kappa}{8}$ replaced in terms of the constant $-\frac{X^2}{M^2}$ where X is the spinor-torsion coupling constant and M the mass of torsion: in this theory, then, the self-interaction is repulsive, exactly like in the Nambu--Jona-Lasinio model, and with non-linearities manifested at the energy scale given by the torsion mass. Recently, closed-form exact solutions have been found for the Nambu--Jona-Lasinio model.

== See also ==
- Dirac equation
- Dirac equation in the algebra of physical space
- Dirac–Kähler equation
- Gross–Neveu model
- Higher-dimensional gamma matrices
- Nonlinear Schrödinger equation
- Pokhozhaev's identity for the stationary nonlinear Dirac equation
- Soler model
- Thirring model
