= Thirring model =

Solvable 1+1 dimensional quantum field theory

The Thirring model is an exactly solvable quantum field theory which describes the self-interactions of a Dirac field in (1+1) dimensions. It is named after Walter Thirring who introduced the massless case in 1958.

== Definition ==
The Thirring model is given by the Lagrangian density

$$\mathcal{L}= \overline{\psi}(i\partial\!\!\!/-m)\psi -\frac{g}{2}\left(\overline{\psi}\gamma^\mu\psi\right) \left(\overline{\psi}\gamma_\mu \psi\right)\$$

where $\psi=(\psi_+,\psi_-)$ is the field, g is the coupling constant, m is the mass, and $\gamma^\mu$, for $\mu = 0,1$, are the two-dimensional gamma matrices.

This is the unique model of (1+1)-dimensional, Dirac fermions with a local (self-)interaction. Indeed, since there are only 4 independent fields, because of the Pauli principle, all the quartic, local interactions are equivalent; and all higher power, local interactions vanish. (Interactions containing derivatives, such as $(\bar \psi\partial\!\!\!/\psi)^2$, are not considered because they are non-renormalizable.)

The correlation functions of the Thirring model (massive or massless) verify the Osterwalder–Schrader axioms, and hence the theory makes sense as a quantum field theory.

== Massless case ==
The massless Thirring model is exactly solvable in the sense that a formula for the $n$-points field correlation is known.

=== Exact solution ===
After it was introduced by Walter Thirring, many authors tried to solve the massless case, with confusing outcomes. The correct formula for the two and four point correlation was finally found by K. Johnson; then C. R. Hagen and B. Klaiber extended the explicit solution to any multipoint correlation function of the fields.

== Massive Thirring model (MTM) ==
The mass spectrum of the model and the scattering matrix was explicitly evaluated by Bethe ansatz. An explicit formula for the correlations is not known. Ignacio Cirac, Paolo Maraner and Jiannis K. Pachos applied the massive Thirring model to the description of optical lattices.

=== Exact solution ===
In one space dimension and one time dimension the model can be solved by the Bethe ansatz. This helps one calculate exactly the mass spectrum and scattering matrix. Calculation of the scattering matrix reproduces the results published earlier by Alexander Zamolodchikov. The paper with the exact solution of Massive Thirring model by Bethe ansatz was first published in Russian. Ultraviolet renormalization was done in the frame of the Bethe ansatz. The fractional charge appears in the model during renormalization as a repulsion beyond the cutoff.

Multi-particle production cancels on mass shell.

The exact solution shows once again the equivalence of the Thirring model and the quantum sine-Gordon model. The Thirring model is S-dual to the sine-Gordon model. The fundamental fermions of the Thirring model correspond to the solitons of the sine-Gordon model.

== Bosonization ==
Sidney Coleman discovered in 1975 an equivalence between the Thirring and the sine-Gordon models. Despite the fact that the latter is a pure boson model, massless Thirring fermions are equivalent to free bosons; besides massive fermions are equivalent to the sine-Gordon bosons. This phenomenon is more general in two dimensions and is called bosonization.

== See also ==
- Dirac equation
- Gross–Neveu model
- Nonlinear Dirac equation
- Soler model
