= Corrections (disambiguation) =

Corrections is society's handling of persons after their conviction of a criminal offense.

Corrections may also refer to:

- The Corrections, a 2001 novel by Jonathan Franzen
- The Corrections (band), a British rock band
- Department of Corrections (New Zealand)
- CORRECTIONS, a YouTube-exclusive segment of Late Night with Seth Meyers

== See also ==
- Correction (disambiguation)
