= On-shell renormalization scheme =

Renormalization scheme in quantum field theory

In quantum field theory, and especially in quantum electrodynamics, the interacting theory leads to infinite quantities that have to be absorbed in a renormalization procedure, in order to be able to predict measurable quantities. The renormalization scheme can depend on the type of particles that are being considered. For particles that can travel asymptotically large distances, or for low energy processes, the on-shell scheme, also known as the physical scheme, is appropriate. If these conditions are not fulfilled, one can turn to other schemes, like the minimal subtraction scheme (MS scheme).

== Fermion propagator in the interacting theory ==
Knowing the different propagators is the basis for being able to calculate Feynman diagrams which are useful tools to predict, for example, the result of scattering experiments. In a theory where the only field is the Dirac field, the Feynman propagator reads

$$\langle 0 | T(\psi(x)\bar{\psi}(0))| 0 \rangle =iS_F(x) = \int \frac{d^4p}{(2\pi)^4}\frac{ie^{-ip\cdot x}}{p\!\!\!/-m+i\epsilon}$$

where $T$ is the time-ordering operator, $|0\rangle$ the vacuum in the non interacting theory, $\psi(x)$ and $\bar{\psi}(x)$ the Dirac field and its Dirac adjoint, and where the left-hand side of the equation is the two-point correlation function of the Dirac field.

In a new theory, the Dirac field can interact with another field, for example with the electromagnetic field in quantum electrodynamics, and the strength of the interaction is measured by a parameter, in the case of QED it is the bare electron charge, $e$. The general form of the propagator should remain unchanged, meaning that if $|\Omega\rangle$ now represents the vacuum in the interacting theory, the two-point correlation function would now read

$$\langle \Omega | T(\psi(x)\bar{\psi}(0))| \Omega \rangle = \int \frac{d^4p}{(2\pi)^4}\frac{i Z_2 e^{-i p\cdot x}}{p\!\!\!/-m_r+i\epsilon}$$

Two new quantities have been introduced. First the renormalized mass $m_r$ has been defined as the pole in the Fourier transform of the Feynman propagator. This is the main prescription of the on-shell renormalization scheme (there is then no need to introduce other mass scales like in the minimal subtraction scheme). The quantity $Z_2$ represents the new strength of the Dirac field. As the interaction is turned down to zero by letting $e\rightarrow 0$, these new parameters should tend to a value so as to recover the propagator of the free fermion, namely $m_r\rightarrow m$ and $Z_2\rightarrow 1$.

This means that $m_r$ and $Z_2$ can be defined as a series in $e$ if this parameter is small enough (in the unit system where $\hbar=c=1$, $e=\sqrt{4\pi\alpha}\simeq 0.3$, where $\alpha$ is the fine-structure constant). Thus these parameters can be expressed as

$$Z_2=1+\delta_2$$
$$m_r = m + \delta m$$

On the other hand, the modification to the propagator can be calculated up to a certain order in $e$ using Feynman diagrams. These modifications are summed up in the fermion self energy $\Sigma(p)$

$$\langle \Omega | T(\psi(x)\bar{\psi}(0))| \Omega \rangle = \int \frac{d^4p}{(2\pi)^4}\frac{ie^{-i p\cdot x}}{p\!\!\!/-m - \Sigma(p) +i\epsilon}$$

These corrections are often divergent because they contain loops. By identifying the two expressions of the correlation function up to a certain order in $e$, the counterterms can be defined, and they are going to absorb the divergent contributions of the corrections to the fermion propagator. Thus, the renormalized quantities, such as $m_r$, will remain finite, and will be the quantities measured in experiments.

== Photon propagator ==
Just like what has been done with the fermion propagator, the form of the photon propagator inspired by the free photon field will be compared to the photon propagator calculated up to a certain order in $e$ in the interacting theory. The photon self energy is noted $\Pi(q^2)$ and the metric tensor $\eta^{\mu\nu}$ (here taking the +--- convention)

$$\langle \Omega | T(A^{\mu}(x)A^{\nu}(0))| \Omega \rangle = \int \frac{d^4q}{(2\pi)^4}\frac{-i\eta^{\mu\nu}e^{-i p\cdot x}}{q^2(1 - \Pi(q^2)) +i\epsilon} = \int \frac{d^4q}{(2\pi)^4}\frac{-iZ_3 \eta^{\mu\nu}e^{-i p\cdot x}}{q^2 +i\epsilon}$$

The behaviour of the counterterm $\delta_3=Z_3-1$ is independent of the momentum of the incoming photon $q$. To fix it, the behaviour of QED at large distances (which should help recover classical electrodynamics), i.e. when $q^2\rightarrow 0$, is used :

$$\frac{-i\eta^{\mu\nu}e^{-i p\cdot x}}{q^2(1 - \Pi(q^2)) +i\epsilon}\sim\frac{-i\eta^{\mu\nu}e^{-i p\cdot x}}{q^2}$$

Thus the counterterm $\delta_3$ is fixed with the value of $\Pi(0)$.

== Vertex function ==
A similar reasoning using the vertex function leads to the renormalization of the electric charge $e_r$. This renormalization, and the fixing of renormalization terms is done using what is known from classical electrodynamics at large space scales. This leads to the value of the counterterm $\delta_1$, which is, in fact, equal to $\delta_2$ because of the Ward–Takahashi identity. It is this calculation that accounts for the anomalous magnetic dipole moment of fermions.

== Rescaling of the QED Lagrangian ==
We have considered some proportionality factors (like the $Z_i$) that have been defined from the form of the propagator. However they can also be defined from the QED Lagrangian, which will be done in this section, and these definitions are equivalent. The Lagrangian that describes the physics of quantum electrodynamics is

$$\mathcal L = -\frac{1}{4} F_{\mu \nu} F^{\mu \nu} + \bar{\psi}(i \partial\!\!\!/ - m )\psi + e \bar{\psi} \gamma^\mu \psi A_{\mu}$$

where $F_{\mu \nu}$ is the field strength tensor, $\psi$ is the Dirac spinor (the relativistic equivalent of the wavefunction), and $A$ the electromagnetic four-potential. The parameters of the theory are $\psi$, $A$, $m$ and $e$. These quantities happen to be infinite due to loop corrections (see below). One can define the renormalized quantities (which will be finite and observable):

$$\psi = \sqrt{Z_2} \psi_r \;\;\;\;\;
A = \sqrt{Z_3} A_r \;\;\;\;\;
m = m_r + \delta m \;\;\;\;\;
e = \frac{Z_1}{Z_2 \sqrt{Z_3}} e_r \;\;\;\;\;
\text{with} \;\;\;\;\; Z_i = 1 + \delta_i$$

The $\delta_i$ are called counterterms (some other definitions of them are possible). They are supposed to be small in the parameter $e$. The Lagrangian now reads in terms of renormalized quantities (to first order in the counterterms):

$$\mathcal L = -\frac{1}{4} Z_3 F_{\mu \nu,r} F^{\mu \nu}_r + Z_2 \bar{\psi}_r(i \partial\!\!\!/ - m_r )\psi_r - \bar{\psi}_r\delta m \psi_r + Z_1 e_r \bar{\psi}_r \gamma^\mu \psi_r A_{\mu,r}$$

A renormalization prescription is a set of rules that describes what part of the divergences should be in the renormalized quantities and what parts should be in the counterterms. The prescription is often based on the theory of free fields, that is of the behaviour of $\psi$ and $A$ when they do not interact (which corresponds to removing the term $e \bar{\psi} \gamma^\mu \psi A_{\mu}$ in the Lagrangian).
