= Juan José Giambiagi =

Argentine physicist (1924–1996)

- Born: 18 June 1924; Buenos Aires, Argentina
- Died: 8 January 1996 (aged 71); Rio de Janeiro, Brazil
- Education: University of Buenos Aires
- Known for: Dimensional regularization
- Awards: Premio México de Ciencia y Tecnología (1990)
- Scientific career
- Fields: Theoretical physics
- Workplaces: University of Buenos Aires; National University of La Plata; Centro Brasileiro de Pesquisas Físicas
- Thesis: Aplicación del método de Hadamard a algunos problemas de físicomatemática (1950)
- Doctoral advisor: Alberto González Domínguez

Juan José Giambiagi (18 June 1924 – 8 January 1996) was an Argentine theoretical physicist. He was professor of the University of Buenos Aires but after a series of coup d'états in Argentina, he moved to Brazil. He is known for the discovery of dimensional regularization in quantum field theory.

== Life ==
Juan José Giambiagi was born in Buenos Aires in 1924. studied at the University of Buenos Aires (UBA) graduating in 1948, and obtaining a doctorate in physics in 1950. His thesis was titled "Application of the Hadamard method to some problems in mathematical physics" (Spanish: Aplicación del método de Hadamard a algunos problemas de físicomatemática) and his PhD advisor was Alberto González Domínguez.

He became faculty of UBA from 1957 to 1956. Under his direction, physicist Miguel Ángel Virasoro was recruited.

In 1960, Giambiagi, José Leite Lopes from Brazil and Marcos Moshinsky from Mexico, founded the Centro Latino-Americano de Física (CLAF).

After the Argentine Revolution of 1966, General Juan Carlos Onganía dissolved university autonomy and chased academics opposed to his regime. Due to these events, 69 of the 75 professors and researchers of the School of Exact and Natural Sciences of UBA had resigned, including Giambiagi. Along with his collaborator Carlos Guido Bollini and two other professors, Giambiagi a wrote a letter in the Argentine newspaper La Nación to condemn the attack on universities.

Giambiagi and Bollini continued to work outside of UBA. From 1968 to 1976 they worked in the math department of the National University of La Plata, which at the time was smaller and underfunded. Despite the issues, this period was considered their most productive period.

In 1973, Giambiagi was arrested for alleged participation on Jewish or communist conspiracies. However he was released for his collaborations with the United States government during his time at UBA.

After the 1976 Argentine coup d'état, the University of La Plata was targeted by the new authorities. That year, Giambiagi was detained again and interrogated. After being released, Giambiagi escaped with his family to Brazil. Giambiagi started working in Centro Brasileiro de Pesquisas Físicas, as head of the particle-physics department from 1978 to 1985.

In 1986, Giambiagi became the director of CLAF.

Giamgiagi was an early supporter of the creation of the International Centre for Theoretical Physics (ICTP) and was in ICTP Scientific Council from 1987 to 1995.

Giambiagi died in 1996 in Rio de Janeiro.

== Work on dimensional regularization ==
In 1971, Giambiagi and Carlos Guido Bollini, published the first work on dimensional regularization. Their method allows to treat divergent integrals. It consist in calculating the integrals in d = 4 + ε dimensions and later take the limit ε → 0 only at the very end. Their work was inspired by Giambiagi's doctoral advisor Alberto González Domínguez on analytical regularization. Giambiagi and Bollini tried to publish in Physics Letters B in 1971 but their work was rejected by the referees. Their work was later accepted, in August 1972, and in Il Nuovo Cimento in November 1972. Meanwhile, Gerard 't Hooft and Martinus J. G. Veltman independently discovered dimensional regularization but got their paper published in July 1972 before Giambiagi and Bollini. Veltman admitted to have seen drafts of Giambiagi and Bollini's work.

Both t' Hooft and Veltman were awarded the Nobel Prize in Physics in 1999 for "elucidating the quantum structure of electroweak interactions in physics.”, but the work of Giambiagi and Bollini was not cited in the document references. However, Veltman mentioned “the independent work of Bollini and Giambiagi,” in his Nobel lecture.

== Honors and awards ==
After the death of Giambiagi, the physics department at UBA was renamed the Juan José Giambiagi Department of Physics. At ICTP, the Giambiagi lecture hall was created.
