= Acceleron =

Hypothetical subatomic particle

An acceleron is a hypothetical scalar boson postulated to relate the mass of the neutrino to the dark energy conjectured to be responsible for the accelerating expansion of the universe. The acceleron was postulated by researchers at the University of Washington in 2004.
