= Nonoblique correction =

In four-fermion scattering processes of particle physics, a nonoblique correction, also called a direct correction, refers to a radiative correction of type

e^{+} + e^{−} → q + q̅

in the electroweak sector of the Standard Model. These corrections are being studied at the CERN LEP collider. Together with the oblique corrections, nonoblique corrections can be used to constrain models of physics beyond the Standard Model.

== Classes ==
There are three classes of radiative corrections to these processes:

- vacuum polarization corrections,
- vertex corrections, and
- box corrections.

The vertex and box corrections, which depend on the identity of the initial and final state fermions, are referred to as the non-oblique corrections. The vacuum polarization corrections are referred to as oblique corrections, since they only affect the mixing and propagation of the gauge bosons and they do not depend on which type of fermions appear in the initial or final states.

== Examples ==
An example of a vertex correction is the nonuniversality (flavor dependence) of the couplings of the quarks and leptons to the charged and neutral weak currents. Another example is the anomalous magnetic dipole moment.

In order to affect the nonoblique corrections, particles must couple directly to the external fermions. Such couplings are expected to be suppressed in most cases, with one exception being the $Z b \bar{b}$ vertex.

== See also ==
- Initial and final state radiation
- Lepton § Universality
