= Minimal subtraction scheme =

Renormalization scheme in quantum field theory

In quantum field theory, the minimal subtraction scheme, or MS scheme, is a particular renormalization scheme used to absorb the infinities that arise in perturbative calculations beyond leading order, introduced independently by Gerard 't Hooft and Steven Weinberg in 1973. The MS scheme consists of absorbing only the divergent part of the radiative corrections into the counterterms.

In the similar and more widely used modified minimal subtraction, or MS-bar scheme (M̅S̅), one absorbs the divergent part plus a universal constant that always arises along with the divergence in Feynman diagram calculations into the counterterms. When using dimensional regularization, i.e. $\ \mathrm{d}^4 p \to \mu^{4-d} \mathrm{d}^d p\ ,$ it is implemented by rescaling the renormalization scale: $\ \mu^2 \to \mu^2 \frac{ e^{\gamma_{\mathrm E}} }{4\ \pi}\ ,$ with the Euler–Mascheroni constant, $\ \gamma_{\mathrm E}\ .$
