= Higgs sector =

In particle physics, the Higgs sector is the collection of quantum fields and/or particles that are responsible for the Higgs mechanism, i.e. for the spontaneous symmetry breaking of the Higgs field. The word "sector" refers to a subgroup of the total set of fields and particles.

== See also ==
- Higgs boson
- Hidden sector
