= Dressed particle =

Particle together with excitations from other fields

In theoretical physics, a dressed particle or clothed particle is a bare particle together with some excitations of other quantum fields that are inseparable from the bare particle. For example, a dressed electron includes the cloud of virtual electron–positron pairs and photons surrounding the original electron. Another example are polaritons in solid-state physics, dressed quasiparticles of dipolar excitations in a medium with photons.

In radiobiology, a dressed particle is a bare particle together with its Debye sphere that neutralizes its electric charge.

== See also ==
- Constituent quark
