= Vertex function =

Effective particle coupling beyond tree level

In quantum electrodynamics, the vertex function describes the coupling between a photon and an electron beyond the leading order of perturbation theory. In particular, it is the one particle irreducible correlation function involving the fermion $\psi$, the antifermion $\bar{\psi}$, and the vector potential A. But the use of a vertex function is not limited to QED.

== Definition ==
The vertex function $\Gamma^\mu$ can be defined in terms of a functional derivative of the effective action S_{eff} as

$$\Gamma^\mu = -{1\over e}{\delta^3 S_{\mathrm{eff}}\over \delta \bar{\psi} \delta \psi \delta A_\mu}$$

The one-loop correction to the vertex function. This is the dominant contribution to the anomalous magnetic moment of the electron.

The dominant (and classical) contribution to $\Gamma^\mu$ is the gamma matrix $\gamma^\mu$, which explains the choice of the letter. The vertex function is constrained by the symmetries of quantum electrodynamics — Lorentz invariance; gauge invariance or the transversality of the photon, as expressed by the Ward identity; and invariance under parity — to take the following form:

$$\Gamma^\mu = \gamma^\mu F_1(q^2) + \frac{i \sigma^{\mu\nu} q_{\nu}}{2 m} F_2(q^2)$$

where $\sigma^{\mu\nu} = (i/2) [\gamma^{\mu}, \gamma^{\nu}]$, $q_{\nu}$ is the incoming four-momentum of the external photon (on the right-hand side of the figure), and F_{1}(q^{2}) and F_{2}(q^{2}) are the Dirac and Pauli form factors, respectively, that depend only on the momentum transfer q^{2}. At tree level (or leading order), F_{1}(q^{2}) = 1 and F_{2}(q^{2}) = 0. Beyond leading order, the corrections to F_{1}(0) are exactly canceled by the field strength renormalization. The form factor F_{2}(0) corresponds to the anomalous magnetic moment a of the fermion, defined in terms of the Landé g-factor as:

$$a = \frac{g-2}{2} = F_2(0)$$

In 1948, Julian Schwinger calculated the first correction to anomalous magnetic moment, given by

$F_2(0)\approx \frac{\alpha}{2\pi}$

where α is the fine-structure constant.

== See also ==
- Nonoblique correction
