= Murray Gell-Mann =

American theoretical physicist (1929–2019)

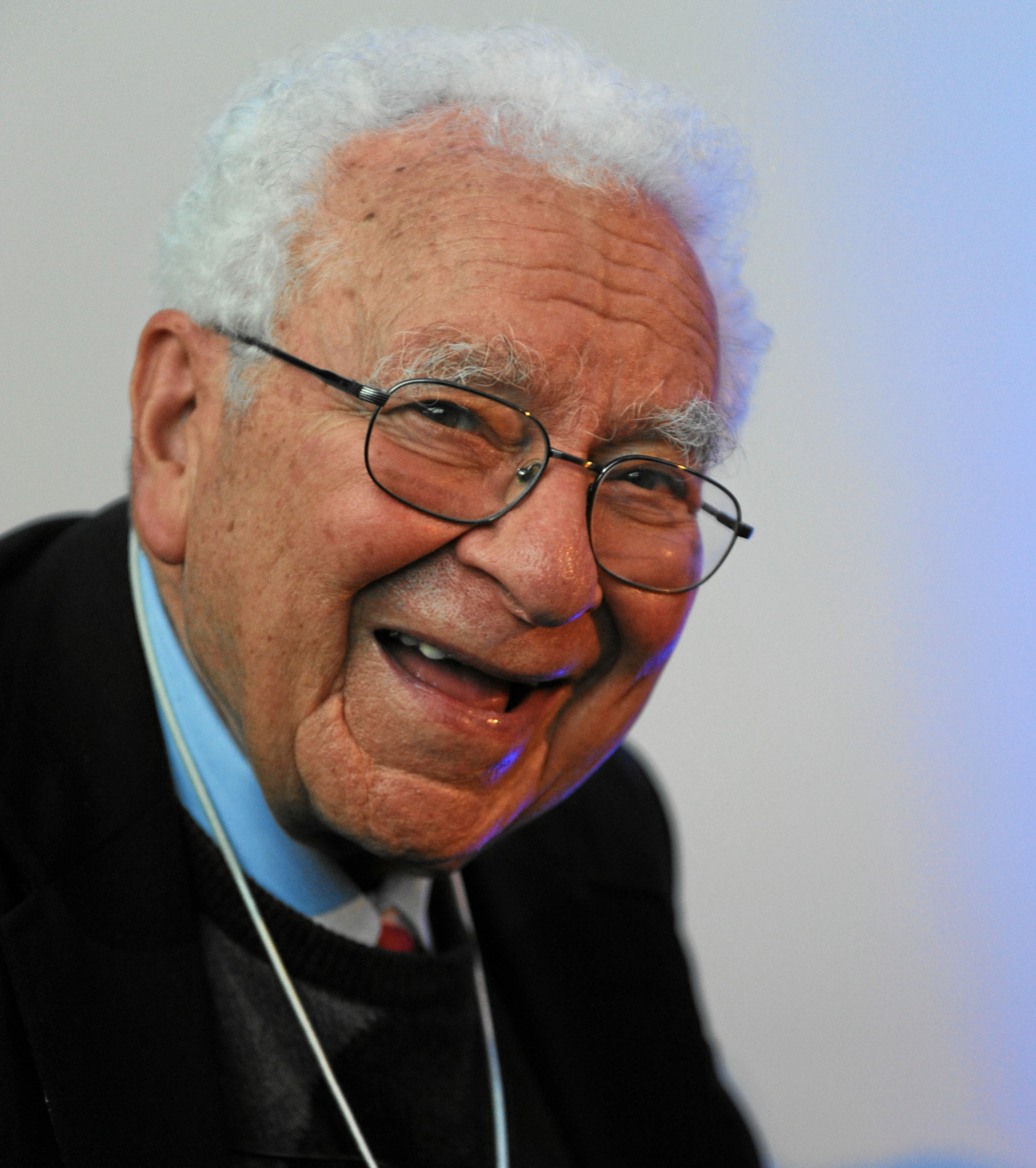
- Gell-Mann in 2012
- Born: September 15, 1929; Manhattan, New York City, U.S.
- Died: May 24, 2019 (aged 89); Santa Fe, New Mexico, U.S.
- Education: Yale University (BS); Massachusetts Institute of Technology (PhD)
- Known for: Coining the term "quark"; Quark model; Quantum chromodynamics; Eightfold way; Elementary particles; Neutral particle oscillation; Gell-Mann and Low theorem; Gell-Mann matrices; Gell-Mann−Low renormalization group equation; Gell-Mann–Nishijima formula; Gell-Mann–Okubo mass formula; V−A theory; Current algebra; Sigma model of pions; Seesaw theory of neutrino masses; Strangeness; Crossing symmetry; Consistent histories; Totalitarian principle; Plectics; Effective complexity
- Spouses: J. Margaret Dow (m. 1955; died 1981) Marcia Southwick (m. 1992)
- Children: 2
- Parents: Arthur Isidore Gell-Mann (father); Pauline (née Reichstein) (mother)
- Awards: Dannie Heineman Prize for Mathematical Physics (1959); E. O. Lawrence Award (1966); John J. Carty Award (1968); Nobel Prize in Physics (1969); ForMemRS (1978)
- Scientific career
- Fields: Theoretical physics
- Workplaces: Santa Fe Institute; University of New Mexico; University of Southern California; California Institute of Technology; University of Chicago; University of Illinois Urbana-Champaign; Institute for Advanced Study; Columbia University
- Thesis: Coupling strength and nuclear reactions (1951)
- Doctoral advisor: Victor Weisskopf
- Doctoral students: Kenneth G. Wilson; Sidney Coleman; Rod Crewther; James Hartle; Christopher T. Hill; H. Jay Melosh; Kenneth Young; Barton Zwiebach
- Website: santafe.edu/~mgm

Murray Gell-Mann (/ˈmʌri ˈɡɛl ˈmæn/; September 15, 1929 – May 24, 2019) was an American theoretical physicist who played a preeminent role in the development of the theory of elementary particles. Gell-Mann introduced the concept of quarks as the fundamental building blocks of the strongly interacting particles, and the renormalization group as a foundational element of quantum field theory and statistical mechanics. He received the 1969 Nobel Prize in Physics for his contributions and discoveries concerning the classification of elementary particles and their interactions.

Gell-Mann played key roles in developing the concept of chirality in the theory of the weak interactions and spontaneous chiral symmetry breaking in the strong interactions, which controls the physics of the light mesons. In the 1970s he was a co-inventor of quantum chromodynamics (QCD) which explains the confinement of quarks in mesons and baryons and forms a large part of the Standard Model of elementary particles and forces.

== Life and education ==
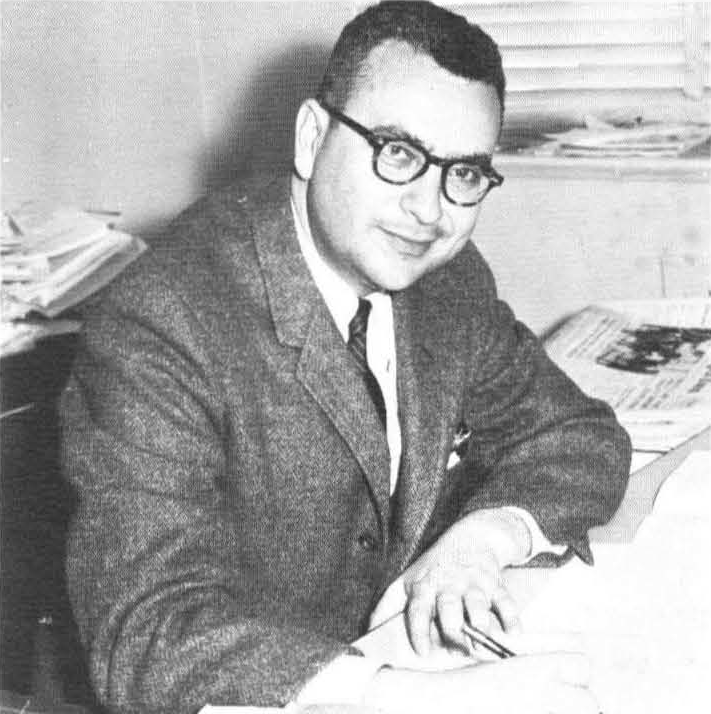
Gell-Mann in 1965

Gell-Mann was born in Lower Manhattan to a family of Jewish immigrants from the Austro-Hungarian Empire, specifically from Czernowitz in present-day Ukraine. His parents were Pauline (née Reichstein) and Arthur Isidore Gelman, who taught English as a second language. Gell-Mann married J. Margaret Dow in 1955; they had a daughter and a son. Margaret died in 1981, and in 1992 he married Marcia Southwick, whose son became his stepson.

Gell-Mann graduated valedictorian from the Columbia Grammar & Preparatory School aged 14 and subsequently entered Yale College as a member of Jonathan Edwards College. At Yale, he participated in the William Lowell Putnam Mathematical Competition and was on the team representing Yale University (along with Murray Gerstenhaber and Henry O. Pollak) that won the second prize in 1947.

Gell-Mann graduated from Yale with a bachelor's degree in physics in 1948 and intended to pursue graduate studies in physics. He sought to remain in the Ivy League for his graduate education and applied to Princeton University as well as Harvard University. He was rejected by Princeton and accepted by Harvard, but the latter institution was unable to offer him needed financial assistance. He was then accepted by the Massachusetts Institute of Technology (MIT) and received a letter from Victor Weisskopf urging him to attend MIT and become Weisskopf's research assistant. This would provide Gell-Mann with the financial assistance he required. Unaware of MIT's eminent status in physics research, Gell-Mann was "miserable" and said he first considered suicide.

Gell-Mann received his Ph.D. in physics from MIT in 1951 after completing a doctoral dissertation, titled "Coupling strength and nuclear reactions", under the supervision of Weisskopf. Subsequently, Gell-Mann was a postdoctoral fellow at the Institute for Advanced Study at Princeton in 1951, and a visiting research professor at the University of Illinois at Urbana–Champaign from 1952 to 1953. (Note: In 1954, there, working with Francis E. Low, he discovered the renormalization group equation of QED.) He was a visiting associate professor at Columbia University and an associate professor at the University of Chicago in 1954–1955, before moving to the California Institute of Technology, where he taught from 1955 until he retired in 1993.

Gell-Mann died on May 24, 2019, at his home in Santa Fe, New Mexico.

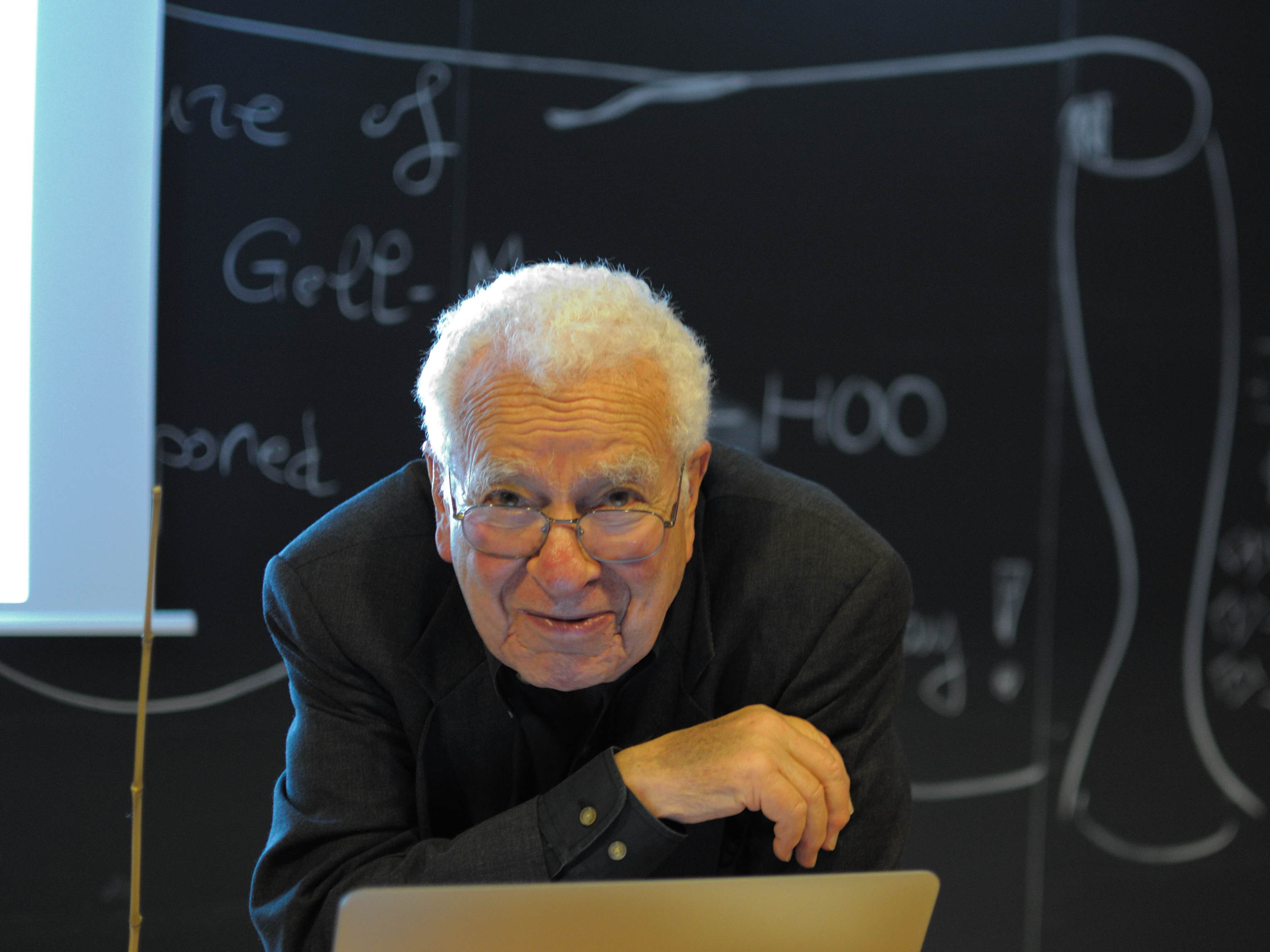
Gell-Mann in 2012

== Professional life and controversies ==
Gell-Mann was the Robert Andrews Millikan Professor of Theoretical Physics Emeritus at California Institute of Technology as well as a university professor in the physics and astronomy department of the University of New Mexico in Albuquerque, New Mexico, and the Presidential Professor of Physics and Medicine at the University of Southern California. He was a member of the editorial board of the Encyclopædia Britannica.

Gell-Mann was on sabbatical at the Collège de France for the academic year 1958–1959. Gell-Mann spent several periods at CERN, the laboratories of the European Organization for Nuclear Research in Geneva, Switzerland, including time as a fellow of the John Simon Guggenheim Memorial Foundation. In 1972, he was on CERN's payroll as visiting professor. That same year, Gell-Mann was criticized for his involvement with JASON, a scientific advisory group that supported the U.S. Department of Defense during the Vietnam War. His association with the group was the focus of protests in France and Italy.

In 1984 Gell-Mann was one of several co-founders of the Santa Fe Institute—a non-profit theoretical research institute in Santa Fe, New Mexico intended to study various aspects of a complex system and disseminate the notion of a separate interdisciplinary study of complexity theory.

In his 1994 popular book The Quark and the Jaguar: Adventures in the Simple and the Complex, Gell-Mann acknowledged financial support from Jeffrey Epstein, who contributed via the Santa Fe Institute. In 2003, Gell-Mann also contributed a letter to The First Fifty Years, a collection of birthday greetings for Epstein. Years later, in 2011, Gell-Mann reportedly attended the "Mindshift Conference" on Epstein's private island, Little Saint James. The gathering was organized by Epstein and science promoter Al Seckel. Gell-Mann's name also appeared in Epstein's so-called "black book," a personal address book listing Epstein's close contacts. In 2025, Ghislaine Maxwell testified that Gell-Mann had originally been introduced to Epstein through her.

George Johnson has written a biography of Gell-Mann, Strange Beauty: Murray Gell-Mann, and the Revolution in 20th-Century Physics (1999), Although Gell-Mann himself criticized Strange Beauty for some inaccuracies, with one interviewer reporting him wincing at the mention of it, the book was acclaimed by a number of his colleagues. A revised second edition was published in 2023 by the Santa Fe Institute Press with a foreword by Douglas Hofstadter. In 2012 Gell-Mann and his companion Mary McFadden published the book Mary McFadden: A Lifetime of Design, Collecting, and Adventure.

== Scientific contributions ==
In 1958, Gell-Mann, in collaboration with Richard Feynman, in parallel with the independent team of E. C. George Sudarshan and Robert Marshak, discovered the chiral structures of the weak interaction of physics and developed the V-A theory (vector minus axial vector theory). This work followed the experimental discovery of the violation of parity by Chien-Shiung Wu, as suggested theoretically by Chen-Ning Yang and Tsung-Dao Lee.

Gell-Mann's work in the 1950s involved recently discovered cosmic ray particles that came to be called kaons and hyperons. Classifying these particles led him to propose that a quantum number, called strangeness, would be conserved by the strong and the electromagnetic interactions, but not by the weak interaction. Another of Gell-Mann's ideas is the Gell-Mann–Okubo formula, which was, initially, a formula based on empirical results, but was later explained by his quark model. Gell-Mann and Abraham Pais were involved in explaining this puzzling aspect of the neutral kaon mixing.

Murray Gell-Mann's fortunate encounter with mathematician Richard Earl Block at Caltech, in the fall of 1960, "enlightened" him to introduce a novel classification scheme, in 1961, for hadrons. A similar scheme had been independently proposed by Yuval Ne'eman, and has come to be explained by the quark model. Gell-Mann referred to the scheme as the eightfold way, because of the octets of particles in the classification (the term is a reference to the Eightfold Path of Buddhism).

Gell-Mann, along with Maurice Lévy, developed the sigma model of pions, which describes low-energy pion interactions.

In 1964, Gell-Mann and, independently, George Zweig went on to postulate the existence of quarks, particles which make up the hadrons of this scheme. The name "quark" was coined by Gell-Mann, and is a reference to the novel Finnegans Wake, by James Joyce ("Three quarks for Muster Mark!" book 2, episode 4). Zweig had referred to the particles as "aces", but Gell-Mann's name caught on. Quarks, antiquarks, and gluons were soon established as the underlying elementary objects in the study of the structure of hadrons. He was awarded a Nobel Prize in Physics in 1969 for his contributions and discoveries concerning the classification of elementary particles and their interactions.

In the 1960s, he introduced current algebra as a method of systematically exploiting symmetries to extract predictions from quark models, in the absence of reliable dynamical theory. This method led to model-independent sum rules confirmed by experiment, and provided starting points underpinning the development of the Standard Model (SM), the widely accepted theory of elementary particles.

In 1972 Gell-Mann, together with Harald Fritzsch, Heinrich Leutwyler and William A. Bardeen, considered a Yang-Mills theory of "quark color," and coined the term quantum chromodynamics (QCD) as the gauge theory of the strong interaction. The quark model is a part of QCD, and it has been robust enough to accommodate in a natural fashion the discovery of new "flavors" of quarks, which has superseded the eightfold way scheme.

Gell-Mann was responsible, with Pierre Ramond and Richard Slansky, and independently of Peter Minkowski, Rabindra Mohapatra, Goran Senjanović, Sheldon Glashow, and Tsutomu Yanagida, for proposing the seesaw theory of neutrino masses. This produces masses at the large scale in any theory with a right-handed neutrino. He is also known to have played a role in keeping string theory alive through the 1970s and early 1980s, supporting that line of research at a time when it was a topic of niche interest.

Gell-Mann was a proponent of the consistent histories approach to understanding quantum mechanics, which he advocated in papers with James Hartle.

Gell-Mann's extensive interests outside of physics included archaeology, numismatics, birdwatching and linguistics. Along with S. A. Starostin, he established the Evolution of Human Languages project at the Santa Fe Institute. As a humanist and an agnostic, Gell-Mann was a Humanist Laureate in the International Academy of Humanism. Novelist Cormac McCarthy saw Gell-Mann as a polymath who "knew more things about more things than anyone I've ever met...losing Murray is like losing the Encyclopædia Britannica."

== Awards and honors ==
Gell-Mann won numerous awards and honours including the following:

- 1959 – Dannie Heineman Prize for Mathematical Physics
- 1960 – Elected member of the National Academy of Sciences
- 1962 – American Academy of Achievement's Golden Plate Award
- 1964 – Elected member of the American Academy of Arts and Sciences
- 1966 – Ernest Orlando Lawrence Award
- 1967 – Franklin Medal
- 1968 – National Academy of Sciences – John J. Carty Award
- 1969 – Research Corporation Award
- 1969 – Nobel Prize in Physics
- 1978 – Elected a Foreign Member of the Royal Society (ForMemRS)
- 1988 – United Nations Environment Programme Roll of Honor for Environmental Achievement (The Global 500)
- 1993 – Elected member of The American Philosophical Society
- 2005 – Albert Einstein Medal
- 2005 – American Humanist Association – Humanist of the Year
- 2014 – Helmholtz-Medal of the Berlin-Brandenburg Academy of Sciences and Humanities

Universities that gave Gell-Mann honorary doctorates include Cambridge, Columbia, the University of Chicago, Oxford and Yale.

== See also ==
- Complex adaptive system
- Gell-Mann amnesia effect
- Kaon
- Non-linear sigma model
- Omega baryon
- Pseudoscalar meson
- Random phase approximation
- List of Jewish Nobel laureates
