= Feigenbaum =

Feigenbaum is a German surname meaning "fig tree". Notable people with the surname include:

- Armand V. Feigenbaum (1920–2014), American quality control expert
- B. J. Feigenbaum (1900–1984), American legislator and lawyer
- Clive Feigenbaum, stamp dealer
- Edward Feigenbaum (born 1936), American computer scientist known as the "father of expert systems"
- Eran Feigenbaum (born 1974), Israeli information security expert and mentalist
- Joan Feigenbaum (born 1958), American computer scientist
- Juliusz Feigenbaum (1872–1944), father of Polish record industry, founder of the company Syrena Record
- Mitchell Feigenbaum (1944–2019), American mathematical physicist
- William M. Feigenbaum (1886–1949), American politician from New York
- Yehoshua Feigenbaum (born 1947), Israeli footballer

== See also ==
- Feigenbaum function
- Feigenbaum constants
