= Feigenbaum function =

Concept in dynamical systems

In the study of dynamical systems the term Feigenbaum function has been used to describe two different functions introduced by the physicist Mitchell Feigenbaum:

- the solution to the Feigenbaum-Cvitanović functional equation; and
- the scaling function that described the covers of the attractor of the logistic map

== Idea ==
=== Period-doubling route to chaos ===
In the logistic map,

| $x_{n+1} = r x_n (1 - x_n),$ | 1 |

we have a function $f_r(x) = rx(1-x)$, and we want to study what happens when we iterate the map many times. The map might fall into a fixed point, a fixed cycle, or chaos. When the map falls into a stable fixed cycle of length $n$, we would find that the graph of $f_r^n$ and the graph of $x\mapsto x$ intersects at $n$ points, and the slope of the graph of $f_r^n$ is bounded in $(-1, +1)$ at those intersections.

For example, when $r=3.0$, we have a single intersection, with slope bounded in $(-1, +1)$, indicating that it is a stable single fixed point.

As $r$ increases to beyond $r=3.0$, the intersection point splits to two, which is a period doubling. For example, when $r=3.4$, there are three intersection points, with the middle one unstable, and the two others stable.

As $r$ approaches $r = 3.45$, another period-doubling occurs in the same way. The period-doublings occur more and more frequently, until at a certain $r\approx 3.56994567$, the period doublings become infinite, and the map becomes chaotic. This is the period-doubling route to chaos.

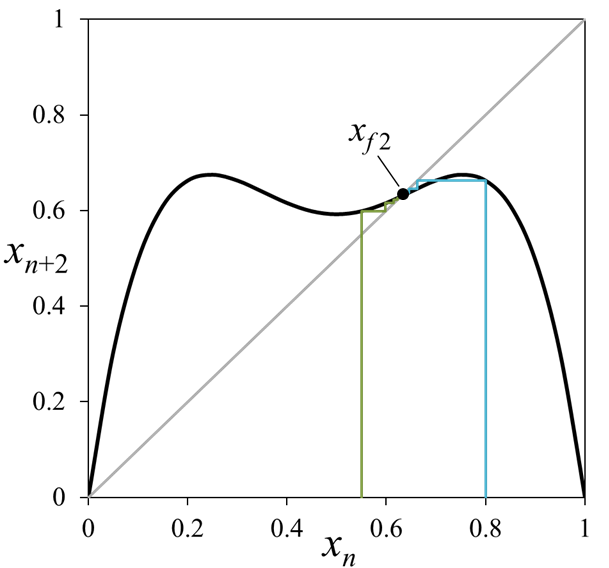
Relationship between $x_{n+2}$ and $x_{n}$ when $a=2.7$. Before the period doubling bifurcation occurs. The orbit converges to the fixed point $x_{f2}$.

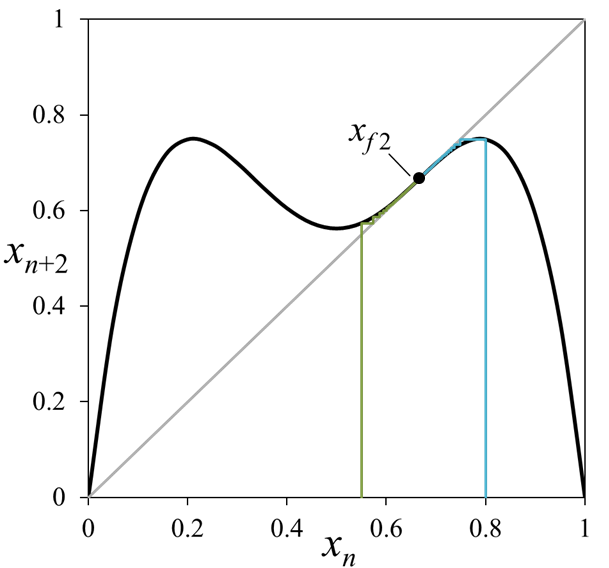
Relationship between $x_{n+2}$ and $x_{n}$ when $a=3$. The tangent slope at the fixed point $x_{f2}$. is exactly 1, and a period doubling bifurcation occurs.

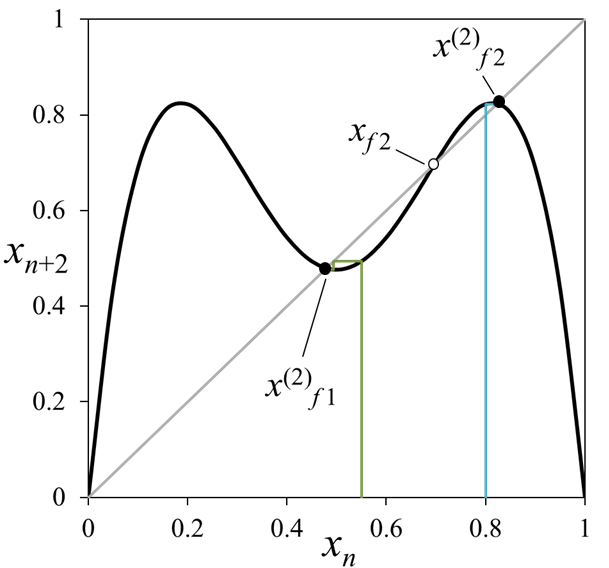
Relationship between $x_{n+2}$ and $x_{n}$ when $a=3.3$. The fixed point $x_{f2}$ becomes unstable, splitting into a periodic-2 stable cycle.

When $r=3.0$, we have a single intersection, with slope exactly $+1$, indicating that it is about to undergo a period-doubling.

When $r=3.4$, there are three intersection points, with the middle one unstable, and the two others stable.

When $r=3.45$, there are three intersection points, with the middle one unstable, and the two others having slope exactly $+1$, indicating that it is about to undergo another period-doubling.

When $r\approx 3.56994567$, there are infinitely many intersections, and we have arrived at chaos via the period-doubling route.

=== Scaling limit ===
Approach to the scaling limit as $r$ approaches $r^* = 3.5699\cdots$ from below.

At the point of chaos $r^* = 3.5699\cdots$, as we repeat the period-doublings$f^{1}_{r^*}, f^{2}_{r^*}, f^{4}_{r^*}, f^{8}_{r^*}, f^{16}_{r^*}, \dots$, the graphs seem to resemble each other, except that they are shrunken towards the middle, and rotated by 180 degrees, converging to a fractal.

Looking at the images, one can notice that at the point of chaos $r^* = 3.5699\cdots$, the curve of $f^{\infty}_{r^*}$ looks like a fractal. Furthermore, as we repeat the period-doublings$f^1_{r^*}, f^2_{r^*}, f^4_{r^*}, f^8_{r^*}, f^{16}_{r^*}, \dots$, the graphs seem to resemble each other, except that they are shrunken towards the middle, and rotated by 180 degrees.

This suggests to us a scaling limit: if we repeatedly double the function, then scale it up by $\alpha$ for a certain constant $\alpha$:
$$f(x) \mapsto -\alpha f( f(-x/\alpha ) )$$
then at the limit, we would end up with a function $g$ that satisfies $g(x) = -\alpha g( g(-x/\alpha ) )$. Further, as the period-doubling intervals become shorter and shorter, the ratio between two period-doubling intervals converges to a limit, the first Feigenbaum constant $\delta = 4.6692016\cdots$.

For the wrong values of scaling factor $\alpha$, the map does not converge to a limit, but when $\alpha = 2.5029\dots$, it converges.

At the point of chaos $r^* = 3.5699\cdots$, as we repeat the functional equation iteration $f(x) \mapsto -\alpha f( f(-x/\alpha ) )$ with $\alpha = 2.5029\dots$, we find that the map does converge to a limit.

The constant $\alpha$ can be numerically found by trying many possible values. For the wrong values, the map does not converge to a limit, but when it is $\alpha = 2.5029\dots$, it converges. This is the second Feigenbaum constant.

=== Chaotic regime ===
In the chaotic regime, $f^\infty_r$, the limit of the iterates of the map, becomes chaotic dark bands interspersed with non-chaotic bright bands.

In the chaotic regime, $f^\infty_r$, the limit of the iterates of the map, becomes chaotic dark bands interspersed with non-chaotic bright bands.

=== Other scaling limits ===
When $r$ approaches $r \approx 3.8494344$, we have another period-doubling approach to chaos, but this time with periods 3, 6, 12, ... This again has the same Feigenbaum constants $\delta, \alpha$. The limit of $f(x) \mapsto - \alpha f( f(-x/\alpha ) )$ is also the same function. This is an example of universality.

Logistic map approaching the period-doubling chaos scaling limit $r^* = 3.84943\dots$ from below. At the limit, this has the same shape as that of $r^* = 3.5699\cdots$, since all period-doubling routes to chaos are the same (universality).

We can also consider period-tripling route to chaos by picking a sequence of $r_1, r_2, \dots$ such that $r_n$ is the lowest value in the period-$3^n$ window of the bifurcation diagram. For example, we have $r_1 = 3.8284, r_2 = 3.85361, \dots$, with the limit $r_\infty = 3.854 077 963\dots$. This has a different pair of Feigenbaum constants $\delta= 55.26\dots, \alpha = 9.277\dots$. And $f^\infty_r$converges to the fixed point to
$$f(x) \mapsto - \alpha f(f( f(-x/\alpha ) ))$$
As another example, period-4-pling has a pair of Feigenbaum constants distinct from that of period-doubling, even though period-4-pling is reached by two period-doublings. In detail, define $r_1, r_2, \dots$ such that $r_n$ is the lowest value in the period-$4^n$ window of the bifurcation diagram. Then we have $r_1 =3.960102, r_2 = 3.9615554, \dots$, with the limit $r_\infty = 3.96155658717\dots$. This has a different pair of Feigenbaum constants $\delta= 981.6\dots, \alpha = 38.82\dots$.

In general, each period-multiplying route to chaos has its own pair of Feigenbaum constants. In fact, there are typically more than one. For example, for period-7-pling, there are at least 9 different pairs of Feigenbaum constants.

Generally, $3\delta \approx 2\alpha^2$, and the relation becomes exact as both numbers increase to infinity: $\lim \delta/\alpha^2 = 2/3$.

== Feigenbaum-Cvitanović functional equation ==
This functional equation arises in the study of one-dimensional maps that, as a function of a parameter, go through a period-doubling cascade. Discovered by Mitchell Feigenbaum and Predrag Cvitanović, the equation is the mathematical expression of the universality of period doubling. It specifies a function g and a parameter α by the relation

$$g(x) = - \alpha g( g(-x/\alpha ) )$$

with the initial conditions
$$\begin{cases}
g(0) = 1, \\
g'(0) = 0, \\
g''(0) < 0.
\end{cases}$$
For a particular form of solution with a quadratic dependence of the solution near x = 0, α = 2.5029... is one of the Feigenbaum constants.

The power series of $g$ is approximately
$$g(x) = 1 - 1.52763 x^2 + 0.104815 x^4 + 0.026705 x^6 + O(x^{8})$$

== Renormalization ==
The Feigenbaum function can be derived by a renormalization argument.

The Feigenbaum function satisfies
$$g(x) = \lim_{n\to\infty} \frac{1}{F^{\left(2^n\right)}(0)} F^{\left(2^n\right)}\left(x F^{\left(2^n\right)}(0)\right)$$
for any map on the real line $F$ at the onset of chaos.

== Scaling function ==
The Feigenbaum scaling function provides a complete description of the attractor of the logistic map at the end of the period-doubling cascade. The attractor is a Cantor set, and just as the middle-third Cantor set, it can be covered by a finite set of segments, all bigger than a minimal size d_{n}. For a fixed d_{n} the set of segments forms a cover Δ_{n} of the attractor. The ratio of segments from two consecutive covers, Δ_{n} and Δ_{n+1} can be arranged to approximate a function σ, the Feigenbaum scaling function.

== See also ==
- Logistic map
- Presentation function

== Bibliography ==
- Feigenbaum, M. (1978). "Quantitative universality for a class of nonlinear transformations". Journal of Statistical Physics. 19 (1): 25–52. Bibcode:1978JSP....19...25F. doi:10.1007/BF01020332. MR 0501179. S2CID 124498882.
- Feigenbaum, M. (1979). "The universal metric properties of non-linear transformations". Journal of Statistical Physics. 21 (6): 669–706. Bibcode:1979JSP....21..669F. doi:10.1007/BF01107909. MR 0555919. S2CID 17956295.
- Feigenbaum, Mitchell J. (1980). "The transition to aperiodic behavior in turbulent systems". Communications in Mathematical Physics. 77 (1): 65–86. Bibcode:1980CMaPh..77...65F. doi:10.1007/BF01205039. S2CID 18314876.
- Epstein, H.; Lascoux, J. (1981). "Analyticity properties of the Feigenbaum Function". Commun. Math. Phys. 81 (3): 437–453. Bibcode:1981CMaPh..81..437E. doi:10.1007/BF01209078. S2CID 119924349.
- Feigenbaum, Mitchell J. (1983). "Universal Behavior in Nonlinear Systems". Physica. 7D (1–3): 16–39. Bibcode:1983PhyD....7...16F. doi:10.1016/0167-2789(83)90112-4. Bound as Order in Chaos, Proceedings of the International Conference on Order and Chaos held at the Center for Nonlinear Studies, Los Alamos, New Mexico 87545, USA 24–28 May 1982, Eds. David Campbell, Harvey Rose; North-Holland Amsterdam ISBN 0-444-86727-9.
- Lanford III, Oscar E. (1982). "A computer-assisted proof of the Feigenbaum conjectures". Bull. Am. Math. Soc. 6 (3): 427–434. doi:10.1090/S0273-0979-1982-15008-X. MR 0648529.
- Campanino, M.; Epstein, H.; Ruelle, D. (1982). "On Feigenbaums functional equation $g\circ g(\lambda x)+\lambda g(x)=0$". Topology. 21 (2): 125–129. doi:10.1016/0040-9383(82)90001-5. MR 0641996.
- Lanford III, Oscar E. (1984). "A shorter proof of the existence of the Feigenbaum fixed point". Commun. Math. Phys. 96 (4): 521–538. Bibcode:1984CMaPh..96..521L. doi:10.1007/BF01212533. S2CID 121613330.
- Epstein, H. (1986). "New proofs of the existence of the Feigenbaum functions" (PDF). Commun. Math. Phys. 106 (3): 395–426. Bibcode:1986CMaPh.106..395E. doi:10.1007/BF01207254. S2CID 119901937.
- Eckmann, Jean-Pierre; Wittwer, Peter (1987). "A complete proof of the Feigenbaum Conjectures". J. Stat. Phys. 46 (3/4): 455. Bibcode:1987JSP....46..455E. doi:10.1007/BF01013368. MR 0883539. S2CID 121353606.
- Stephenson, John; Wang, Yong (1991). "Relationships between the solutions of Feigenbaum's equation". Appl. Math. Lett. 4 (3): 37–39. doi:10.1016/0893-9659(91)90031-P. MR 1101871.
- Stephenson, John; Wang, Yong (1991). "Relationships between eigenfunctions associated with solutions of Feigenbaum's equation". Appl. Math. Lett. 4 (3): 53–56. doi:10.1016/0893-9659(91)90035-T. MR 1101875.
- Briggs, Keith (1991). "A precise calculation of the Feigenbaum constants". Math. Comp. 57 (195): 435–439. Bibcode:1991MaCom..57..435B. doi:10.1090/S0025-5718-1991-1079009-6. MR 1079009.
- Tsygvintsev, Alexei V.; Mestel, Ben D.; Obaldestin, Andrew H. (2002). "Continued fractions and solutions of the Feigenbaum-Cvitanović equation". Comptes Rendus de l'Académie des Sciences, Série I. 334 (8): 683–688. doi:10.1016/S1631-073X(02)02330-0.
- Mathar, Richard J. (2010). "Chebyshev series representation of Feigenbaum's period-doubling function". arXiv:1008.4608 [math.DS].
- Varin, V. P. (2011). "Spectral properties of the period-doubling operator". KIAM Preprint. 9. arXiv:1202.4672.
- Weisstein, Eric W. "Feigenbaum Function". MathWorld.
