= Goran Senjanović =

Theoretical physicist (born 1950)

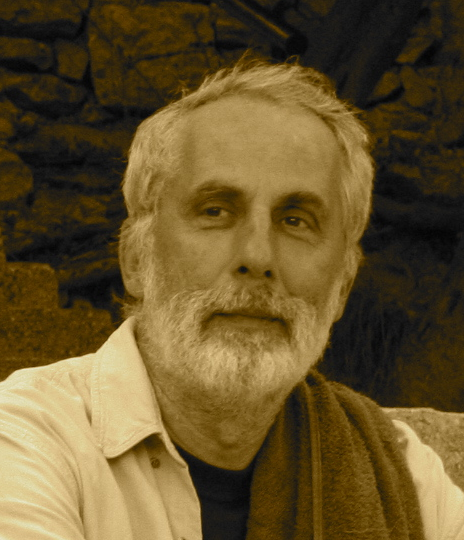
- Senjanović in 2006
- Born: June 9, 1950 (age 76); Split, Yugoslavia (now Croatia)
- Education: University of Belgrade; City College of New York
- Known for: Seesaw mechanism Left-right symmetry Supersymmetric unification
- Scientific career
- Fields: Theoretical Physics
- Workplaces: International Centre for Theoretical Physics

Goran Senjanović (born June 9, 1950) is a theoretical physicist at the Abdus Salam International Centre for Theoretical Physics (ICTP). He received his Ph.D. at the City College of New York in 1978, under the supervision of Rabindra Mohapatra. Before joining the ICTP in 1991, he worked as a staff member at the Brookhaven National Laboratory and as a professor of physics at the University of Zagreb. His major research interests are neutrino physics, unification of elementary particle forces, baryon and lepton number violation and supersymmetry.

Senjanović is best known for the seesaw mechanism, which he proposed together with Rabindra Mohapatra in 1979, independently of Peter Minkowski, Sheldon Glashow, Murray Gell-Mann, Pierre Ramond, Richard Slansky and Tsutomu Yanagida. The seesaw mechanism is today the main scenario behind the mystery of tiny neutrino mass. According to this mechanism, the origin of neutrino mass is attributed to the existence of its heavy right-handed neutrino. In the works of Minkowski, and Mohapatra and Senjanović, the smallness of neutrino mass is related to the maximality of parity violation in weak interactions.

Senjanović, together with Mohapatra, Jogesh Pati and Abdus Salam, is one of the proponents of the left-right symmetric theory of electroweak interactions, introduced in the 1970s order to understand the origin of parity violation in nature. In this theory, the left-right symmetry is broken spontaneously, which allows for its restoration at high energies. In this context, in a paper with Wai-Yee Keung in 1983, he proposed a way to directly probe lepton number violation and test the Majorana nature of right-handed neutrinos at hadron colliders, today a paradigm for such processes at the Large Hadron Collider at CERN.

Senjanović is also known for his work on supersymmetric gauge coupling unification. Following the original suggestions of Savas Dimopoulos, Stuart Raby and Frank Wilczek, and Luis Ibáñez and Graham G. Ross, together with William J. Marciano, he showed in 1981 that the supersymmetric unification was tied to the large top quark mass, around 200 GeV, years before experiment.

In 2010, an international conference was organized in the honour of his 60th birthday in Split, Croatia.

He has one daughter, Natasha.

== See also ==
- List of theoretical physicists
