= Robert Marshak =

American physicist (1916–1992)

Robert Eugene Marshak
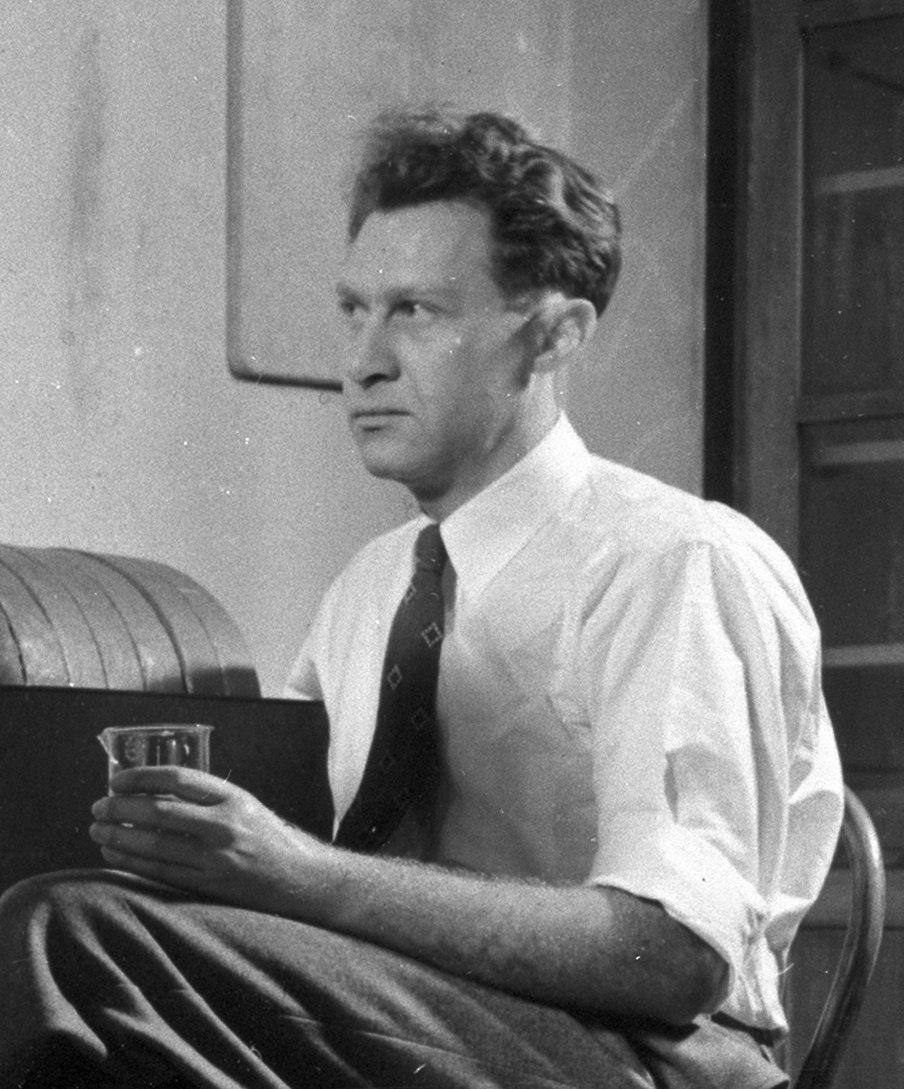
- Marshak in 1939 with a glass of radiosodium he has been drinking from during a radioactive tracer experiment

8th President of City College of New York
- In office 1970–1979
- Preceded by: Buell G. Gallagher
- Succeeded by: Bernard W. Harleston

President of the American Physical Society
- In office 1983–1983
- Preceded by: Maurice Goldhaber
- Succeeded by: Mildred Dresselhaus

Personal details
- Born: October 11, 1916
- Died: December 23, 1992 (aged 76)
- Education: Columbia University (BA); Cornell University (PhD)

Robert Eugene Marshak (October 11, 1916 – December 23, 1992) was an American physicist, educator, and the eighth president of the City College of New York. As chair of the physics department at the University of Rochester, Marshak founded the Rochester Conference, which became the International Conference on High Energy Physics. During World War II he worked on the Manhattan Project at Los Alamos, where he developed a theory of radiation-driven shock waves at extreme temperatures now known as Marshak waves.

== Biography ==
Marshak was born in the Bronx, New York City. His parents, Harry and Rose Marshak, were Jewish immigrants from Minsk. He went to the City College of New York for one semester and then "received a Pulitzer Scholarship which provided full tuition and a stipend which allowed him to continue his education at Columbia University." At Columbia, Robert Marshak was a member of the Philolexian Society, the college's literary and debate society.

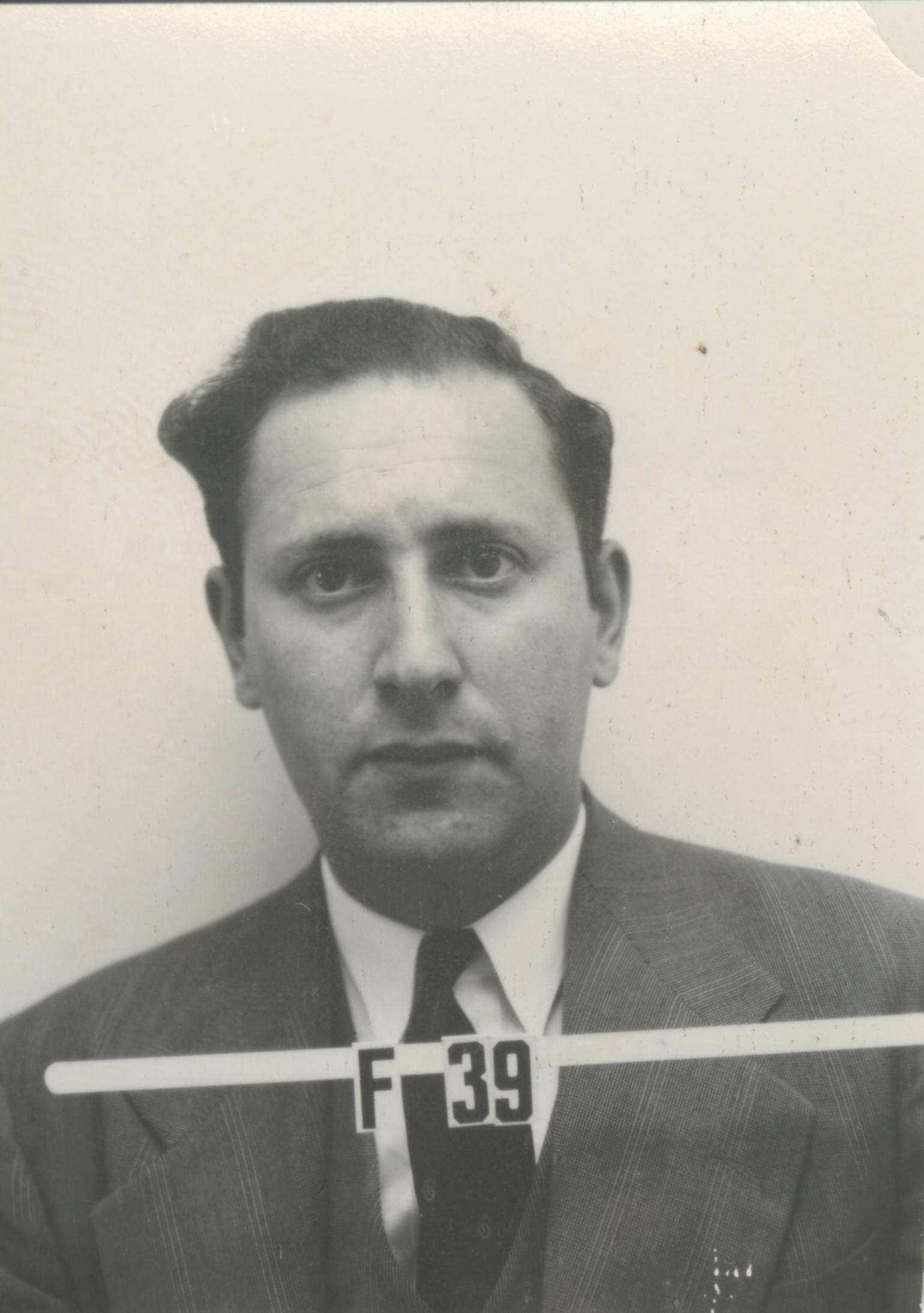
Marshak's ID badge from the Manhattan Project

In 1939, Marshak received his Ph.D. from Cornell University. Along with his thesis advisor, Hans Bethe, he discovered many of the fusion aspects involved in star formation. This helped him on his work for the Manhattan Project, in Los Alamos, during World War II. During this time, he developed an explanation of how shock waves work in extremely high temperatures achieved by a nuclear explosion, and these waves are known as Marshak waves.

Following the war, Marshak joined the University of Rochester Department of Physics, becoming head of the department in 1950.

In 1947, at the Shelter Island Conference, Marshak presented his two-meson hypothesis about the pi-meson, which were discovered shortly thereafter. Three years later, Marshak established the Rochester Conference while chair of the University of Rochester's physics department. This later became known as the International Conference on High Energy Physics.

In 1957, Marshak and George Sudarshan proposed a V-A ("vector" minus "axial vector") Lagrangian for weak interactions, which eventually paved the way for the electroweak theory. This theory was later presented by Richard Feynman and Murray Gell-Mann, which later contributed to each winning a Nobel Prize in Physics. Sudarshan stated that Gell-Mann had learned the theory from him at the Rochester Conference. Similarly, Richard Feynman learned about the theory from a discussion with Marshak in a conference. Feynman acknowledged Marshak and Sudarshan's contribution in 1963 stating that the V-A theory was discovered by Sudarshan and Marshak and publicized by Gell-Mann and himself.

Marshak was elected to the National Academy of Sciences in 1958, the American Academy of Arts and Sciences in 1961, and the American Philosophical Society in 1983.

In 1970, Marshak left Rochester to become president of the City College of New York. He left to become university distinguished professor at Virginia Tech, retiring in 1991.

Marshak shared the 1982 J. Robert Oppenheimer Memorial Prize with Maurice Goldhaber. The next year he served as the president of the American Physical Society, previously having served on its council (1965-1969), as chairman of its Division of Particles and Fields (1969-1970), and as vice-president.

Marshak died by accidental drowning in Cancún, Mexico. In addition to Sudarshan, his doctoral students include Susumu Okubo, Rabindra Mohapatra and Tullio Regge.

== Selected works ==
- Marshak, Robert E. (1952). Meson Physics. New York: McGraw-Hill. OCLC 459312979
- Marshak, Robert E.; Radha, T.K.; Raman, K. (1963?) Theory of Weak Interactions of Elementary Particles. Matscience report no. 10. Madras: Institute of Mathematical Sciences. OCLC 474785
- Marshak, Robert E.; Blaker, J. Warren; Bethe, Hans A.; et al. (1966). Perspectivies in Modern Physics: Essays in Honor of Hans A. Bethe on the Occasion of His 60th Birthday, July 1966. New York: Interscience Publishers. OCLC 418981
- Marshak, Robert E.; Riazuddin; Ryan, Ciaran P. (1969). Theory of Weak Interactions in Particle Physics. New York: Wiley-Interscience. OCLC 977600031
- Marshak, Robert E.; Wurtemburg, Gladys (1982). Academic Renewal in the 1970s : Memoirs of a City College President. Washington, D.C.: University Press of America. ISBN 0819127795, 9780819127792, 0819127809, 9780819127808 OCLC 8763508
- Marshak, Robert E. (1993). Conceptual Foundations of Modern Particle Physics. Singapore: World Scientific. ISBN 9810210981, 9789810210984, 9810211066, 9789810211066 OCLC 925757241

== Resources ==
- Henley, Ernest M.; Lustig, Harry (1999). Robert Eugene Marshak, 1916-1992. Washington, D.C.: National Academies Press. OCLC 681760054
- Sudarshan, E.C.G.; et al. (1995). A Gift of Prophecy: Essays in Celebration of the Life of Robert Eugene Marshak. Singapore: World Scientific, 1995. ISBN 9789812831408, 9812831401 OCLC 854972413
