= Kenneth Young =

Kenneth Young may refer to:

- Kenneth Young (physicist) (born 1947), American physicist and professor of physics at the Chinese University of Hong Kong
- Kenneth Young (New Zealand composer) (born 1955), New Zealand composer and conductor
- Kenneth Young (Scottish composer), Scottish video game audio director, composer, and sound designer
- Kenneth Young (born 1985), American child convict, subject of the documentary film 15 to Life: Kenneth's Story
- Kenneth Victor Young (1933–2017), was an American painter, educator, and designer.
- Kenneth Todd Young, United States Ambassador to Thailand

== See also ==
- Ken Young (born 1943), British academic in public policy and early Cold War history
- Ken Young (marathoner) (born 1941), American physicist and indoor marathon runner
- Kenny Young, American songwriter, producer and environmentalist
- Kenny Young (American football), American football linebacker
