= Jean-Pierre Eckmann =

Swiss mathematical physicist (born 1944)

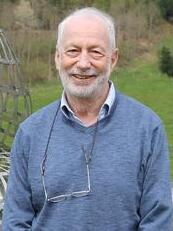
- Eckmann at Oberwolfach, 2023
- Born: 27 January 1944 (age 82)
- Education: University of Geneva
- Scientific career
- Fields: Mathematics
- Workplaces: University of Geneva
- Doctoral advisor: Marcel Guenin
- Doctoral students: Viviane Baladi; Pierre Collet; Martin Hairer

Jean-Pierre Eckmann (born 27 January 1944) is a Swiss mathematical physicist in the department of theoretical physics at the University of Geneva and a pioneer of chaos theory and social network analysis.

Eckmann is the son of mathematician Beno Eckmann. He completed his PhD in 1970 under the supervision of Marcel Guenin at the University of Geneva. He has been a member of the Academia Europaea since 2001. In 2012, he became a fellow of the American Mathematical Society. He is also a member of the Göttingen Academy of Sciences and Humanities.

With Pierre Collet and Oscar Lanford, Eckmann was the first to find a rigorous mathematical argument for the universality of period-doubling bifurcations in dynamical systems, with scaling ratio given by the Feigenbaum constants. In a highly cited 1985 review paper with David Ruelle, he bridged the contributions of mathematicians and physicists to dynamical systems theory and ergodic theory, put the varied work on dimension-like notions in these fields on a firm mathematical footing, and formulated the Eckmann–Ruelle conjecture on the dimension of hyperbolic ergodic measures, "one of the main problems in the interface of dimension theory and dynamical systems". A proof of the conjecture was finally published 14 years later, in 1999. Eckmann has done additional mathematical work in very diverse fields such as statistical mechanics, partial differential equations, and graph theory.

His PhD students have included Viviane Baladi, Pierre Collet, and Martin Hairer.
