= Pierre Collet =

Pierre Collet may refer to:

- Pierre Collet (actor) (1914–1977), French film actor
- Pierre Collet (physicist) (born 1948), French mathematical physicist
