= Gell-Mann and Low theorem =

Theorem concerning quantum field theory ground states

In quantum field theory, the Gell-Mann and Low theorem is a mathematical statement that allows one to relate the ground (or vacuum) state of an interacting system to the ground state of the corresponding non-interacting theory. It was proved in 1951 by Murray Gell-Mann and Francis E. Low. The theorem is useful because, among other things, by relating the ground state of the interacting theory to its non-interacting ground state, it allows one to express Green's functions (which are defined as expectation values of Heisenberg-picture fields in the interacting vacuum) as expectation values of interaction picture fields in the non-interacting vacuum. While typically applied to the ground state, the Gell-Mann and Low theorem applies to any eigenstate of the Hamiltonian. Its proof relies on the concept of starting with a non-interacting Hamiltonian and adiabatically switching on the interactions.

== History ==
The theorem was proved first by Gell-Mann and Low in 1951, making use of the Dyson series. In 1969, Klaus Hepp provided an alternative derivation for the case where the original Hamiltonian describes free particles and the interaction is norm bounded. In 1989, G. Nenciu and G. Rasche proved it using the adiabatic theorem. A proof that does not rely on the Dyson expansion was given in 2007 by Luca Guido Molinari.

== Statement of the theorem ==
Let $|\Psi_0\rangle$ be an eigenstate of $H_0$ with energy $E_0$ and let the 'interacting' Hamiltonian be $H=H_0 + gV$, where $g$ is a coupling constant and $V$ the interaction term. We define a Hamiltonian $H_\epsilon=H_0 + e^{-\epsilon |t|}gV$ which effectively interpolates between $H$ and $H_0$ in the limit $\epsilon \rightarrow 0^+$ and $|t|\rightarrow\infty$. Let $U_{\epsilon I}$ denote the evolution operator in the interaction picture. The Gell-Mann and Low theorem asserts that if the limit as $\epsilon\rightarrow 0^+$ of

$$|\Psi^{(\pm)}_\epsilon \rangle = \frac{ U_{\epsilon I} (0,\pm\infty)  |\Psi_0 \rangle}{\langle \Psi_0 | U_{\epsilon I}(0,\pm\infty)|\Psi_0\rangle}$$

exists, then $|\Psi^{(\pm)}_\epsilon \rangle$ are eigenstates of $H$.

When applied to, say, the ground-state, the theorem does not guarantee that the evolved state will be a ground state. In other words, level crossing is not excluded.

== Proof ==
The theorem is typically proved, following the original paper, using Dyson's expansion of the evolution operator. Its validity however extends beyond the scope of perturbation theory as has been demonstrated by Molinari. We follow Molinari's method here. Focus on $H_\epsilon$ and let $g=e^{\epsilon \theta}$. From Schrödinger's equation for the time-evolution operator

$$i\hbar \partial_{t_1} U_\epsilon(t_1,t_2) = H_\epsilon(t_1) U_\epsilon(t_1,t_2)$$

and the boundary condition $U_\epsilon(t_2,t_2)=1$ we can formally write

$$U_\epsilon(t_1,t_2) = 1+ \frac{1}{i\hbar} \int_{t_2}^{t_1} dt' (H_0 + e^{\epsilon(\theta -|t'|)} V) U_\epsilon(t',t_2).$$

Focus for the moment on the case $0\geq t_1\geq t_2$. Through a change of variables $\tau=t'+\theta$ we can write

$$U_\epsilon(t_1,t_2) = 1+ \frac{1}{i\hbar} \int_{\theta +t_2}^{\theta+t_1} d\tau (H_0 + e^{\epsilon \tau} V) U_\epsilon(\tau-\theta,t_2).$$

We now demonstrate that $\epsilon g \partial_g U_\epsilon(t_1,t_2) = \partial_{t_1} U_\epsilon(t_1,t_2) + \partial_{t_2} U_\epsilon(t_1,t_2)$.

Consider a g-independent operator $H'(t) = H_0 + e^{\epsilon t}V$ and its corresponding evolution operator $U'(t_1, t_2)$. We can write

$$U_\epsilon(t_1,t_2) = 1+ \frac{1}{i\hbar} \int_{\theta+t_2}^{\theta+t_1} d\tau H'(\tau) U_\epsilon(\tau-\theta,t_2).$$

Using the same technique with $U_\epsilon(t_1,t_2)$, write the equation for $U'(t_1 + \theta, t_2 + \theta)$ as

$$U'(t_1+\theta,t_2+\theta) = 1+ \frac{1}{i\hbar} \int_{\theta+t_2}^{\theta+t_1} d\tau H'(\tau) U_\epsilon(\tau,t_2+\theta).$$

The uniqueness of solution implies the identification

$$U_\epsilon(t_1,t_2) = U'(t_1+\theta,t_2+\theta).$$

Combining these results, we obtain

$$\partial_\theta U_\epsilon(t_1,t_2) = \epsilon g \partial_g U_\epsilon(t_1,t_2) = \partial_{t_1} U_\epsilon(t_1,t_2) + \partial_{t_2} U_\epsilon(t_1,t_2).$$

This result can be combined with the Schrödinger equation and its adjoint

$$-i\hbar \partial_{t_1} U_\epsilon(t_2,t_1) =  U_\epsilon(t_2,t_1) H_\epsilon(t_1)$$

to obtain

$$i\hbar \epsilon g \partial_g U_\epsilon(t_1,t_2) = H_\epsilon(t_1)U_\epsilon(t_1,t_2)- U_\epsilon (t_1,t_2)H_\epsilon (t_2).$$

The corresponding equation between $H_{\epsilon I}, U_{\epsilon I}$ is the same. It can be obtained by pre-multiplying both sides with $e^{i H_0 t_1/\hbar}$, post-multiplying with $e^{i H_0 t_2/\hbar}$ and making use of

$$U_{\epsilon I} (t_1,t_2) = e^{i H_0 t_1/\hbar} U_{\epsilon}(t_1,t_2) e^{-i H_0 t_2 /\hbar}.$$

$$H_{\epsilon I} (t) = e^{i H_0 t/\hbar} H_{\epsilon} (t) e^{-i H_0 t/\hbar}$$

The other case we are interested in, namely $t_2\geq t_1 \geq 0$ can be treated in an analogous fashion and yields an additional minus sign in front of the commutator (we are not concerned here with the case where $t_{1,2}$ have mixed signs). In summary, we obtain

$$\left(H_{\epsilon I, t=0}-E_0 \pm i \hbar \epsilon g \partial_g\right) U_{\epsilon I}(0,\pm\infty) |\Psi_0\rangle = 0.$$

We proceed for the negative-times case. For clarity, let $H = H_{\epsilon I, t=0} = H_0 + gV$ and $U = U_{\epsilon I}(0,-\infty)$

$$i \hbar \epsilon g \partial_g \left(U|\Psi_0\rangle\right) = (H-E_0)U|\Psi_0\rangle.$$

Now using the definition of $\Psi_\epsilon$ we differentiate and eliminate derivatives $\partial_g(U|\Psi_0\rangle)$ using the above expression, finding

$$\begin{align}
i \hbar \epsilon g \partial_g | \Psi_\epsilon \rangle &=
\frac{1}{\langle\Psi_0| U |\Psi_0 \rangle} (H-E_0) U|\Psi_0\rangle
- \frac{U|\Psi_0\rangle }{{\langle\Psi_0 |U| \Psi_0 \rangle}^2} \langle \Psi_0 | ( H-E_0 ) U | \Psi_0\rangle \\
&= (H-E_0)|\Psi_\epsilon\rangle - |\Psi_\epsilon\rangle \langle \Psi_0 |H-E_0|\Psi_\epsilon\rangle \\
& = \left[ H - E \right] |\Psi_\epsilon\rangle.
\end{align}$$

where $E = E_0 + \langle\Psi_0 | H -H_0 | \Psi_\epsilon\rangle$. We can now let $\epsilon\rightarrow 0^+$ as by assumption the $g \partial_g | \Psi_\epsilon \rangle$ in left hand side is finite. We then clearly see that $|\Psi_\epsilon\rangle$ is an eigenstate of $H$ and the proof is complete.
