= Chirality (physics) =

Property of particles related to spin

A chiral phenomenon is one that is not identical to its mirror image (see the article on mathematical chirality). The spin of a particle may be used to define a handedness, or helicity, for that particle, which, in the case of a massless particle, is the same as chirality. A symmetry transformation between the two is called parity transformation. Invariance under parity transformation by a Dirac fermion is called chiral symmetry.

== Chirality and helicity ==
The helicity of a particle is positive ("right-handed") if the direction of its spin is the same as the direction of its motion. It is negative ("left-handed") if the directions of spin and motion are opposite. So a standard clock, with its spin vector defined by the rotation of its hands, has left-handed helicity if tossed with its face directed forwards. The same standard clock if tossed upwards (with face upwards) would be considered to have left-handed helicity while going up and right-handed helicity while falling back (with face still upwards).

Mathematically, helicity is the sign of the projection of the spin vector onto the momentum vector: "left" is negative, "right" is positive.

The chirality of a particle is more abstract: It is determined by whether the particle transforms in a right- or left-handed representation of the Poincaré group. (Note: Note, however, that representations such as Dirac spinors and others, necessarily have both right- and left-handed components. In such cases, we can define projection operators that remove (set to zero) either the right- or left-hand components, and discuss the left- or right-handed portions of the representation that remain.)

For massless particles – photons, gluons, and (hypothetical) gravitons – chirality is the same as helicity; a given massless particle appears to spin in the same direction along its axis of motion regardless of point of view of the observer.

For massive particles – such as electrons, quarks, and neutrinos – chirality and helicity must be distinguished: In the case of these particles, it is possible for an observer to change to a reference frame that is moving faster than the spinning particle is, in which case the particle will then appear to move backwards, and its helicity (which may be thought of as "apparent chirality") will be reversed.

- Helicity is a constant of motion, but it is not Lorentz invariant.
- Chirality is Lorentz invariant, but is not a constant of motion: a massive left-handed spinor, when propagating, will evolve into a right handed spinor over time, and vice versa.

A massless particle moves with the speed of light, so no real observer (who must always travel at less than the speed of light) can be in any reference frame in which the particle appears to reverse its relative direction of spin, meaning that all real observers see the same helicity. Because of this, the direction of spin of massless particles is not affected by a change of inertial reference frame (a Lorentz boost) in the direction of motion of the particle, and the sign of the projection (helicity) is fixed for all reference frames: The helicity of massless particles is a relativistic invariant (a quantity whose value is the same in all inertial reference frames) and always matches the massless particle's chirality.

The discovery of neutrino oscillation implies that neutrinos have mass, leaving the photon as the only confirmed massless particle; gluons are expected to also be massless, although this has not been conclusively tested. (Note: Gravitons are also assumed to be massless, but so far are merely hypothetical.) Hence, these are the only two particles now known for which helicity could be identical to chirality, of which only the photon has been confirmed by measurement. All other observed particles have mass and thus may have different helicities in different reference frames. (Note: It is still possible that as-yet unobserved particles, like the graviton, might be massless, and like the photon, have invariant helicity that matches their chirality.)

== Chiral theories ==
Particle physicists have only observed or inferred left-chiral fermions and right-chiral antifermions engaging in the charged weak interaction. In the case of the weak interaction, which can in principle engage with both left- and right-chiral fermions, only two left-handed fermions interact. Interactions involving right-handed or opposite-handed fermions have not been shown to occur, implying that the universe has a preference for left-handed chirality. This preferential treatment of one chiral realization over another violates parity, as first noted by Chien Shiung Wu in her famous experiment known as the Wu experiment. This is a striking observation, since parity is a symmetry that holds for all other fundamental interactions.

Chirality for a Dirac fermion ψ is defined through the operator γ^{5}, which has eigenvalues ±1; the eigenvalue's sign is equal to the particle's chirality: +1 for right-handed, −1 for left-handed. Any Dirac field can thus be projected into its left- or right-handed component by acting with the projection operators 1/2(1 − γ^{5}) or 1/2(1 + γ^{5}) on ψ. The coupling of the charged weak interaction to fermions is proportional to the first projection operator, which is responsible for this interaction's parity symmetry violation.

A common source of confusion is due to conflating the γ^{5}, chirality operator with the helicity operator. Since the helicity of massive particles is frame-dependent, it might seem that the same particle would interact with the weak force according to one frame of reference, but not another. The resolution to this paradox is that the chirality operator is equivalent to helicity for massless fields only, for which helicity is not frame-dependent. By contrast, for massive particles, chirality is not the same as helicity, or, alternatively, helicity is not Lorentz invariant, so there is no frame dependence of the weak interaction: a particle that couples to the weak force in one frame does so in every frame.

A theory that is asymmetric with respect to chiralities is called a chiral theory, while a non-chiral (i.e., parity-symmetric) theory is sometimes called a vector theory. Many pieces of the Standard Model of physics are non-chiral, which is traceable to anomaly cancellation in chiral theories. Quantum chromodynamics is an example of a vector theory, since both chiralities of all quarks appear in the theory, and couple to gluons in the same way.

The electroweak theory, developed in the mid 20th century, is an example of a chiral theory. Originally, it assumed that neutrinos were massless, and assumed the existence of only left-handed neutrinos and right-handed antineutrinos. After the observation of neutrino oscillations, which implies that no fewer than two of the three neutrinos are massive, the revised theories of the electroweak interaction now include both right- and left-handed neutrinos. However, it is still a chiral theory, as it does not respect parity symmetry.

The exact nature of the neutrino is still unsettled and so the electroweak theories that have been proposed are somewhat different, but most accommodate the chirality of neutrinos in the same way as was already done for all other fermions.

== Chiral symmetry ==
Vector gauge theories with massless Dirac fermion fields ψ exhibit chiral symmetry, i.e., rotating the left-handed and the right-handed components independently makes no difference to the theory. We can write this as the action of rotation on the fields:

$\psi_{\rm L}\rightarrow e^{i\theta_{\rm L}}\psi_{\rm L}$ and $\psi_{\rm R}\rightarrow \psi_{\rm R}$

or

$\psi_{\rm L}\rightarrow \psi_{\rm L}$ and $\psi_{\rm R}\rightarrow e^{i\theta_{\rm R}}\psi_{\rm R}.$

With N flavors, we have unitary rotations instead: U(N)_{L} × U(N)_{R}.

More generally, we write the right-handed and left-handed states as a projection operator acting on a spinor. The right-handed and left-handed projection operators are

$$P_{\rm R} = \frac{1 + \gamma^5}{2}$$

and

$$P_{\rm L} = \frac{1 - \gamma^5}{2}$$

Massive fermions do not exhibit chiral symmetry, as the mass term in the Lagrangian, mψ̅ψ, breaks chiral symmetry explicitly.

Spontaneous chiral symmetry breaking may also occur in some theories, as it most notably does in quantum chromodynamics.

The chiral symmetry transformation can be divided into a component that treats the left-handed and the right-handed parts equally, known as vector symmetry, and a component that actually treats them differently, known as axial symmetry. (cf. Current algebra.) A scalar field model encoding chiral symmetry and its breaking is the chiral model.

The most common application is expressed as equal treatment of clockwise and counter-clockwise rotations from a fixed frame of reference.

The general principle is often referred to by the name chiral symmetry. The rule is absolutely valid in the classical mechanics of Newton and Einstein, but results from quantum mechanical experiments show a difference in the behavior of left-chiral versus right-chiral subatomic particles.

=== Example: u and d quarks in QCD ===
Consider quantum chromodynamics (QCD) with two massless quarks u and d (massive fermions do not exhibit chiral symmetry). The Lagrangian reads

$$\mathcal{L} = \overline{u}\,i\displaystyle{\not}D \,u + \overline{d}\,i\displaystyle{\not}D\, d + \mathcal{L}_\mathrm{gluons}~.$$

In terms of left-handed and right-handed spinors, it reads

$$\mathcal{L} = \overline{u}_{\rm L}\,i\displaystyle{\not}D \,u_{\rm L} + \overline{u}_{\rm R}\,i\displaystyle{\not}D \,u_{\rm R} + \overline{d}_{\rm L}\,i\displaystyle{\not}D \,d_{\rm L}  + \overline{d}_{\rm R}\,i\displaystyle{\not}D \,d_{\rm R} + \mathcal{L}_\mathrm{gluons} ~.$$

(Here, i is the imaginary unit and $\displaystyle{\not}D$ the Dirac operator.)

Defining

$$q = \begin{bmatrix} u \\ d \end{bmatrix} ,$$

it can be written as

$$\mathcal{L} = \overline{q}_{\rm L}\,i\displaystyle{\not}D \,q_{\rm L} + \overline{q}_{\rm R}\,i\displaystyle{\not}D\, q_{\rm R} + \mathcal{L}_\mathrm{gluons} ~.$$

The Lagrangian is unchanged under a rotation of q_{L} by any 2×2 unitary matrix L, and q_{R} by any 2×2 unitary matrix R.

This symmetry of the Lagrangian is called flavor chiral symmetry, and denoted as U(2)_{L} × U(2)_{R}. It decomposes into

$$\mathrm{SU}(2)_\text{L} \times \mathrm{SU}(2)_\text{R} \times \mathrm{U}(1)_V \times \mathrm{U}(1)_A ~.$$

The singlet vector symmetry, U(1)_{V}, acts as

$$q_\text{L} \rightarrow e^{i\theta(x)} q_\text{L} \qquad
q_\text{R} \rightarrow e^{i\theta(x)} q_\text{R} ~,$$

and thus invariant under U(1) gauge symmetry. This corresponds to baryon number conservation.

The singlet axial group U(1)_{A} transforms as the following global transformation

$$q_\text{L} \rightarrow e^{i\theta} q_\text{L} \qquad
q_\text{R} \rightarrow e^{-i\theta} q_\text{R} ~.$$

However, it does not correspond to a conserved quantity, because the associated axial current is not conserved. It is explicitly violated by a quantum anomaly.

The remaining chiral symmetry SU(2)_{L} × SU(2)_{R} turns out to be spontaneously broken by a quark condensate $\textstyle \langle \bar{q}^a_\text{R} q^b_\text{L} \rangle = v \delta^{ab}$ formed through nonperturbative action of QCD gluons, into the diagonal vector subgroup SU(2)_{V} known as isospin. The Goldstone bosons corresponding to the three broken generators are the three pions. As a consequence, the effective theory of QCD bound states like the baryons, must now include mass terms for them, ostensibly disallowed by unbroken chiral symmetry. Thus, this chiral symmetry breaking induces the bulk of hadron masses, such as those for the nucleons — in effect, the bulk of the mass of all visible matter.

In the real world, because of the nonvanishing and differing masses of the quarks, SU(2)_{L} × SU(2)_{R} is only an approximate symmetry to begin with, and therefore the pions are not massless, but have small masses: they are pseudo-Goldstone bosons.

=== More flavors ===
For more "light" quark species, N flavors in general, the corresponding chiral symmetries are U(N)_{L} × U(N)_{R′}, decomposing into

$$\mathrm{SU}(N)_\text{L} \times \mathrm{SU}(N)_\text{R} \times \mathrm{U}(1)_V \times \mathrm{U}(1)_A ~,$$

and exhibiting a very analogous chiral symmetry breaking pattern.

Most usually, N = 3 is taken, the u, d, and s quarks taken to be light (the eightfold way), so then approximately massless for the symmetry to be meaningful to a lowest order, while the other three quarks are sufficiently heavy to barely have a residual chiral symmetry be visible for practical purposes.

=== An application in particle physics ===
In theoretical physics, the electroweak model breaks parity maximally. All its fermions are chiral Weyl fermions, which means that the charged weak gauge bosons W^{+} and W^{−} only couple to left-handed quarks and leptons. (Note: Unlike the W^{+} and W^{−} bosons, the neutral electroweak Z^{0} boson couples to both left and right-handed fermions, although not equally.)

Some theorists found this objectionable, and so conjectured a GUT extension of the weak force which has new, high energy W′ and Z′ bosons, which do couple with right handed quarks and leptons:

$$\frac{ \mathrm{SU}(2)_\text{W}\times \mathrm{U}(1)_Y }{ \mathbb{Z}_2 }$$

to

$$\frac{ \mathrm{SU}(2)_\text{L}\times \mathrm{SU}(2)_\text{R}\times \mathrm{U}(1)_{B-L} }{ \mathbb{Z}_2 }.$$

Here, SU(2)_{L} (pronounced "SU(2) left") is SU(2)_{W} from above, while B−L is the baryon number minus the lepton number. The electric charge formula in this model is given by

$$Q = T_{\rm 3L} + T_{\rm 3R} + \frac{B-L}{2}\,;$$

where $\ T_{\rm 3L}\$ and $\ T_{\rm 3R}\$ are the left and right weak isospin values of the fields in the theory.

There is also the chromodynamic SU(3)_{C}. The idea was to restore parity by introducing a left–right symmetry. This is a group extension of $\mathbb{Z}_2$ (the left-right symmetry) by

$$\frac{ \mathrm{SU}(3)_\text{C}\times \mathrm{SU}(2)_\text{L} \times \mathrm{SU}(2)_\text{R} \times \mathrm{U}(1)_{B-L} }{ \mathbb{Z}_6}$$

to the semidirect product

$$\frac{ \mathrm{SU}(3)_\text{C} \times \mathrm{SU}(2)_\text{L} \times \mathrm{SU}(2)_\text{R} \times \mathrm{U}(1)_{B-L} }{ \mathbb{Z}_6 } \rtimes \mathbb{Z}_2\ .$$

This has two connected components where $\mathbb{Z}_2$ acts as an automorphism, which is the composition of an involutive outer automorphism of SU(3)_{C} with the interchange of the left and right copies of SU(2) with the reversal of U(1)_{B−L}. It was shown by Mohapatra & Senjanovic (1975) that left-right symmetry can be spontaneously broken to give a chiral low energy theory, which is the Standard Model of Glashow, Weinberg, and Salam, and also connects the small observed neutrino masses to the breaking of left-right symmetry via the seesaw mechanism.

In this setting, the chiral quarks

$$(3,2,1)_{+{1 \over 3}}$$

and

$$\left(\bar{3},1,2\right)_{-{1 \over 3}}$$

are unified into an irreducible representation ("irrep")

$$(3,2,1)_{+{1 \over 3}} \oplus \left(\bar{3},1,2\right)_{-{1 \over 3}}\ .$$

The leptons are also unified into an irreducible representation

$$(1,2,1)_{-1} \oplus (1,1,2)_{+1}\ .$$

The Higgs bosons needed to implement the breaking of left-right symmetry down to the Standard Model are

$$(1,3,1)_2 \oplus (1,1,3)_2\ .$$

This then provides three sterile neutrinos which are perfectly consistent with current neutrino oscillation data. Within the seesaw mechanism, the sterile neutrinos become superheavy without affecting physics at low energies.

Because the left–right symmetry is spontaneously broken, left–right models predict domain walls. This left-right symmetry idea first appeared in the Pati–Salam model (1974) and Mohapatra–Pati models (1975).

== Chirality in materials science ==
Chirality in other branches of physics is often used for classifying and studying the properties of bodies and materials under external influences. Classification by chirality, as a special case of symmetry classification, allows for a better understanding of first-principles construction of molecules, crystals, quasicrystals, and more. An example is the homochirality of amino acids in all known forms of life, which can be reproduced in physical experiments under external influence. Optical activity (including circular dichroism and magnetic circular dichroism) of materials is determined by their chirality.

Chiral physical systems are characterized by the absence of invariance under the parity operator. An ambiguity arises in defining chirality in physics depending on whether one compares directions of motion using the reflection or spatial inversion operation. Accordingly, one distinguishes between "true" chirality (which is invariant under the time-reversal operation) and "false" chirality (non-invariant under time reversal).

Many physical quantities change sign under the time-reversal operation (e.g., velocity, power, electric current, magnetization). Accordingly, "false" chirality is so typical in physics that the term can be misleading, and it is clearer to speak of T-invariant and T-non-invariant chirality. Effects related to chirality are described using pseudoscalar or axial vector physical quantities in general, and particularly, in magnetically ordered media, are described using time-direction-dependent chirality. This approach is formalized using dichromatic symmetry groups. T-invariant chirality corresponds to the absence in the symmetry group of any symmetry operations that include spatial inversion $\bar{1}$ or reflection m, according to international notation. The criterion for T-non-invariant chirality is the presence of these symmetry operations, but only when combined with time reversal $1'$, such as operations m′ or $\bar{1}'$.

At the level of atomic structure of materials, one distinguishes vector, scalar, and other types of chirality depending on the direction/sign of triple and vector products of spins.

== See also ==
- Electroweak theory
- Chirality (chemistry)
- Chirality (mathematics)
- Chiral symmetry breaking
- Handedness
- Spinors
- Fermionic field § Dirac fields
- Sigma model
- Chiral model
