= Viviane Baladi =

Swiss mathematician (born 1963)

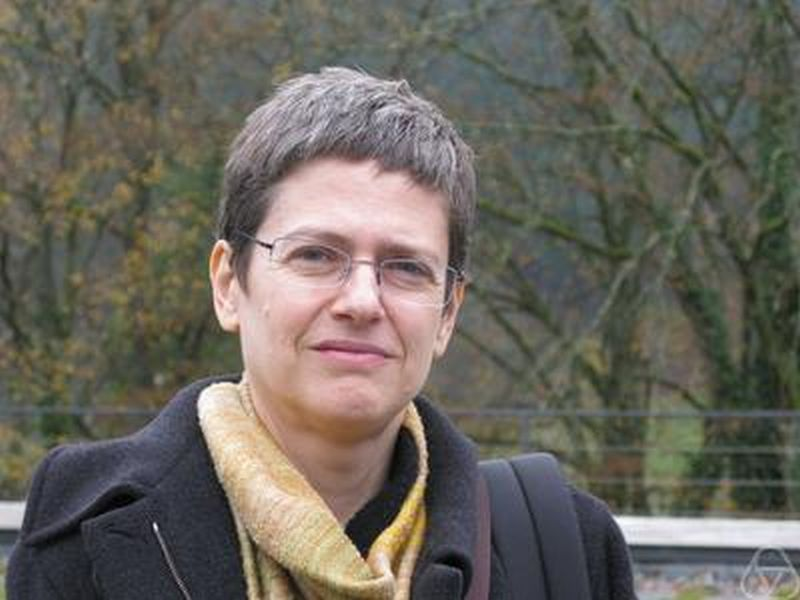
- Baladi at Oberwolfach, 2009
- Born: 23 May 1963 (age 63); Switzerland
- Education: University of Geneva
- Scientific career
- Fields: Mathematics
- Doctoral advisor: Jean-Pierre Eckmann

Viviane Baladi (born 23 May 1963) is a mathematician who works as a director of research at the Centre national de la recherche scientifique (CNRS) in France. Originally Swiss, she has become a naturalized citizen of France. Her research concerns dynamical systems.

== Education and career ==
Baladi earned masters degrees in mathematics and computer science in 1986 from the University of Geneva. She stayed in Geneva for her doctoral studies, finishing a Ph.D. in 1989 under the supervision of Jean-Pierre Eckmann, with a dissertation concerning the zeta functions of dynamical systems.

She worked at CNRS beginning in 1990, with a leave of absence from 1993 to 1999 when she taught at ETH Zurich and the University of Geneva. She also spent a year as a professor at the University of Copenhagen in 2012–2013.

== Books ==
She is the author of the book Positive Transfer Operators and Decay of Correlation (Advanced Series in Nonlinear Dynamics 16, World Scientific, 2000) and of Dynamical Zeta Functions and Dynamical Determinants for Hyperbolic Maps: A Functional Approach (Ergebnisse der Mathematik und ihrer Grenzgebiete 68, Springer, 2018).

== Recognition ==
She was an invited speaker at the International Congress of Mathematicians in 2014, speaking in the section on "Dynamical Systems and Ordinary Differential Equations". She became a member of the Academia Europaea in 2018. Baladi was awarded the CNRS Silver Medal in 2019.
