= Predrag Cvitanović =

Croatian physicist

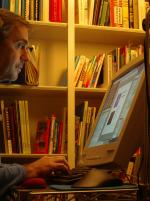
- Predrag Cvitanović
- Born: April 1, 1946 (age 80); Zagreb, SR Croatia
- Known for: Nonlinear Dynamics Theory
- Awards: Humboldt Prize (2009)
- Scientific career
- Fields: Physicist
- Workplaces: Georgia Institute of Technology

Predrag Cvitanović (pronounced [tsʋitǎːnoʋitɕ, - tsʋǐta-]; born April 1, 1946) is a theoretical physicist regarded for his work in nonlinear dynamics, particularly his contributions to periodic orbit theory.

== Life ==
Cvitanović earned his B.S. from MIT in 1969 and his Ph.D. at Cornell University in 1973. Before joining the physics department at the Georgia Institute of Technology he was the director of the Center for Chaos and Turbulence Studies of the Niels Bohr Institute in Copenhagen.

Cvitanović is a member of the Royal Danish Academy of Sciences and Letters, a corresponding member of Croatian Academy of Sciences and Arts, a recipient of the Research Prize of the Danish Physical Society, and a fellow of the American Physical Society.

In 2009 Cvitanović was the recipient of the prestigious Alexander von Humboldt Prize for his work in turbulence theory.

He currently holds the Glen P. Robinson Chair in Non-Linear Science at the Georgia Institute of Technology.

== Scientific work ==
Perhaps his best-known work is his introduction of cycle expansions— that is, expansions based on using periodic orbit theory—to approximate chaotic dynamics in a controlled perturbative way. This technique has proven to be widely useful for diagnosing and quantifying chaotic dynamics in problems ranging from atomic physics to neurophysiology. This theory has been applied by Cvitanović and others to fluid turbulence. Another well-known result is the Feigenbaum-Cvitanović functional equation.

== Books ==
- P. Cvitanović, R. Artuso, R. Mainieri, G. Tanner and G. Vattay, Chaos: Classical and Quantum Niels Bohr Institute, Copenhagen 2005
- P. Cvitanović, Group Theory: Birdtracks, Lie's, and Exceptional Groups Princeton University Press, Princeton 2008, available online at http://birdtracks.eu/

== See also ==
- E7½
- Feigenbaum function
- Penrose graphical notation
