= Stuart Raby =

American physicist

Stuart A. Raby is an American physicist and professor at The Ohio State University, known for his work in theoretical physics. His research focuses on physics beyond the Standard Model, including the grand unification of fundamental forces, supersymmetric theories, and string theory model building.

== Early life and education ==
Raby was born in the Bronx, New York, and raised in Palisades Park, New Jersey, he completed his undergraduate education at the University of Rochester in 1969. He pursued graduate studies at Tel Aviv University, earning an M.Sc. in physics in 1973 under the supervision of Professor David Horn (Israeli physicist). His research focused on quantum mechanics and mathematical methods for physicists. He continued at Tel Aviv University for his doctoral studies, receiving his Ph.D. in 1976 under the guidance of Professor Lawrence Paul Horwitz.

== Academic career ==
From 1976 to 1978, Raby served as a research associate at Cornell University. He then joined Stanford University as an acting assistant professor from 1978 to 1980, teaching advanced graduate courses in electrodynamics, statistical mechanics, and general relativity.

In 1980, Raby transitioned to the Stanford Linear Accelerator Center (SLAC) as a research associate. The following year, he began his association with the Los Alamos National Laboratory, initially as a temporary staff member. Over the next eight years, he rose to the position of group leader of T-8 in the Theory Division, overseeing research in theoretical particle physics.

During 1982–1983, Raby held a visiting associate research scientist position at the University of Michigan. In 1989, Raby joined The Ohio State University as a full professor of physics, a role he continues to hold.

== Work ==
=== Strong interaction dynamics ===
- T. Banks et al. [Cornell-Oxford-Tel Aviv-Yeshiva], Strong Coupling Calculations of the Hadron Spectrum of Quantum Chromodynamics, Phys. Rev. D 15, 1111 (1977).
- S. Raby, S. Dimopoulos and L. Susskind, Tumbling Gauge Theories, Nucl. Phys. B 169, 373-383 (1980).
- S. Dimopoulos, S. Raby and L. Susskind, Light Composite Fermions, Nucl. Phys. B 173, 208-228 (1980).
- S. Dimopoulos, S. Raby and G. L.Kane, Experimental Predictions from Technicolor Theories, Nucl. Phys. B 182, 77-103 (1981).

=== Supersymmetry and Grand Unification ===
- S. Dimopoulos and S. Raby, Supercolor, Nucl. Phys. B 192, 353-368 (1981).
- S. Dimopoulos, S. Raby and F. Wilczek, Supersymmetry and the Scale of Unification, Phys. Rev. D {24, 1681-1683 (1981).
- W. Fischler, H. P. Nilles, J. Polchinski, S. Raby and L. Susskind, Vanishing Renormalization of the D Term in Supersymmetric U(1) Theories, Phys. Rev. Lett. 47, 757 (1981).
- S. Dimopoulos, S. Raby and F. Wilczek, Proton Decay in Supersymmetric Model, Phys. Lett. B {112, 133 (1982).
- S. Dimopoulos and S. Raby, Geometric Hierarchy, Nucl. Phys. B 219, 479 (1983).
- B. A. Ovrut and S.Raby, The Geometrical Hierarchy Model and $N=1$ Supergravity, Phys. Lett. B 125, 270-274 (1983).
- V.\ Lucas and S. Raby, GUT scale threshold corrections in a complete supersymmetric SO(10) model: Alpha-s (m(z)) versus proton lifetime, Phys. Rev. D {54, 2261-2272 (1996).
- S. Raby, M. Ratz and K. Schmidt-Hoberg, Precision gauge unification in the MSSM, Phys. Lett. B 687, 342-348 (2010).

=== Supersymmetry and Cosmology ===
- G. D. Coughlan, W. Fischler, E. W. Kolb, S. Raby and G. G. Ross, Cosmological Problems for the Polonyi Potential, Phys. Lett. B 131, 59-64 (1983).
- J. S. Hagelin, G. L. Kane and S . Raby, Perhaps Scalar Neutrinos Are the Lightest Supersymmetric Partners, Nucl. Phys. B 241, 638-652 (1984).
- J. M. Cline and S. Raby, Gravitino induced baryogenesis: A Problem made a virtue, Phys. Rev. D 43, 1781-1787 (1991).

=== Supersymmetry and Phenomenology ===
- J. M. Frere, D. R. T. Jones and S. Raby, Fermion Masses and Induction of the Weak Scale by Supergravity, Nucl. Phys. B 222, 11-19 (1983).
- L. J. Hall, V. A. Kostelecky and S. Raby, New Flavor Violations in Supergravity Models, Nucl. Phys. B 267, 415-432 (1986).
- S. Dimopoulos, L. J. Hall and S. Raby, A Predictive framework for fermion masses in supersymmetric theories, Phys. Rev. Lett. 68, 1984-1987 (1992).
- S. Dimopoulos, L. J. Hall and S. Raby, A Predictive ansatz for fermion mass matrices in supersymmetric grand unified theories, Phys. Rev. D 45, 4192-4200 (1992).
- T. Blazek, S. Raby and S. Pokorski, Finite supersymmetric threshold corrections to CKM matrix elements in the large tan Beta regime, Phys. Rev. D 52, 4151-4158 (1995).
- S. Dimopoulos, M. Dine, S. Raby, S. D. Thomas and J. D. Wells, Phenomenological implications of low-energy supersymmetry breaking, Nucl. Phys. B Proc. Suppl. 52, 38-42 (1997).
- R. Dermisek, A. Mafi and S. Raby, SUSY GUTs under siege: Proton decay, Phys. Rev. D 63, 035001 (2001).

=== MSSM from the Heterotic String ===
- O. Lebedev, H. P. Nilles, S. Raby, S. Ramos-Sanchez, M. Ratz, Low Energy Supersymmetry from the Heterotic Landscape, Phys. Rev. Lett. 98, 181602 (2007).
- O. Lebedev, H. P. Nilles, S. Raby, S. Ramos-Sanchez, M. Ratz, P. K. S. Vaudrevange and A. Wingerter,A Mini-landscape of exact MSSM spectra in heterotic orbifolds,Phys. Lett. B 645}, 88-94 (2007).
- T. Kobayashi, H. P. Nilles, F. Ploger, S. Raby and M. Ratz, Stringy origin of non-Abelian discrete flavor symmetries, Nucl. Phys. B 768, 135-156 (2007).
- O. Lebedev, H. P. Nilles, S. Raby, S. Ramos-Sanchez, M. Ratz, P. K. S. Vaudrevange and A.~Wingerter, The Heterotic Road to the MSSM with R parity, Phys. Rev. D 77, 046013 (2008).
- H. M. Lee, S. Raby, M. Ratz, G. G. Ross, R. Schieren, K. Schmidt-Hoberg and P. K. S. Vaudrevange,A unique $\mathbb{Z}_4^R$ symmetry for the MSSM, Phys. Lett. B 694, 491-495 (2011).
- R. Kappl, B. Petersen, S. Raby, M. Ratz, R. Schieren and P. K. S. Vaudrevange, String-Derived MSSM Vacua with Residual R Symmetries, Nucl. Phys. B 847, 325-349 (2011).

=== Global SU(5) F-Theory Model ===
- H. Clemens and S. Raby, Heterotic-F-theory Duality with Wilson Line Symmetry-breaking, JHEP 12, 016 (2019).
- H. Clemens and S. Raby, Right-handed neutrinos and U(1\_X symmetry-breaking, JHEP 04, 059 (2020).
- H. Clemens and S. Raby, Relative Scales of the GUT and Twin Sectors in an F-theory model, JHEP 04, 004 (2020).
- J.Kawamura and S.Raby, A Right-handed neutrino portal to the hidden sector: active neutrinos and their twins in an F-theory model, JHEP 02, 239 (2023)
- H. Clemens and S. Raby, The absence of observable proton decay in a global SU(5) F-theory model, JHEP 10, 181 (2023).

== Recognition ==
- Fellowship of the American Physical Society (1988).
- Frontier Fellowship at Fermi National Accelerator Laboratory (March–June 1999).
- Alexander von Humboldt Research Award, awarded by the University of Bonn, Germany (2000–2001, 2002
- CERN Research Scientist, Geneva, Switzerland, March 1 - August 31, 2001.
- Member, School of Natural Sciences|School of Natural Science, Institute for Advanced Study, March 15 – June 15, 2003.

== Books (selected) ==
- Introduction to the standard model and beyond: quantum field theory, symmetries and phenomenology. Cambridge: Cambridge university press. (2021). ISBN 978-1108494199.
- Supersymmetric grand unified theories: from quarks to strings via SUSY GUTs. Cham: Springer. (2017). ISBN 978-3319552538.
