= Pierre Collet (physicist) =

French mathematical physicist

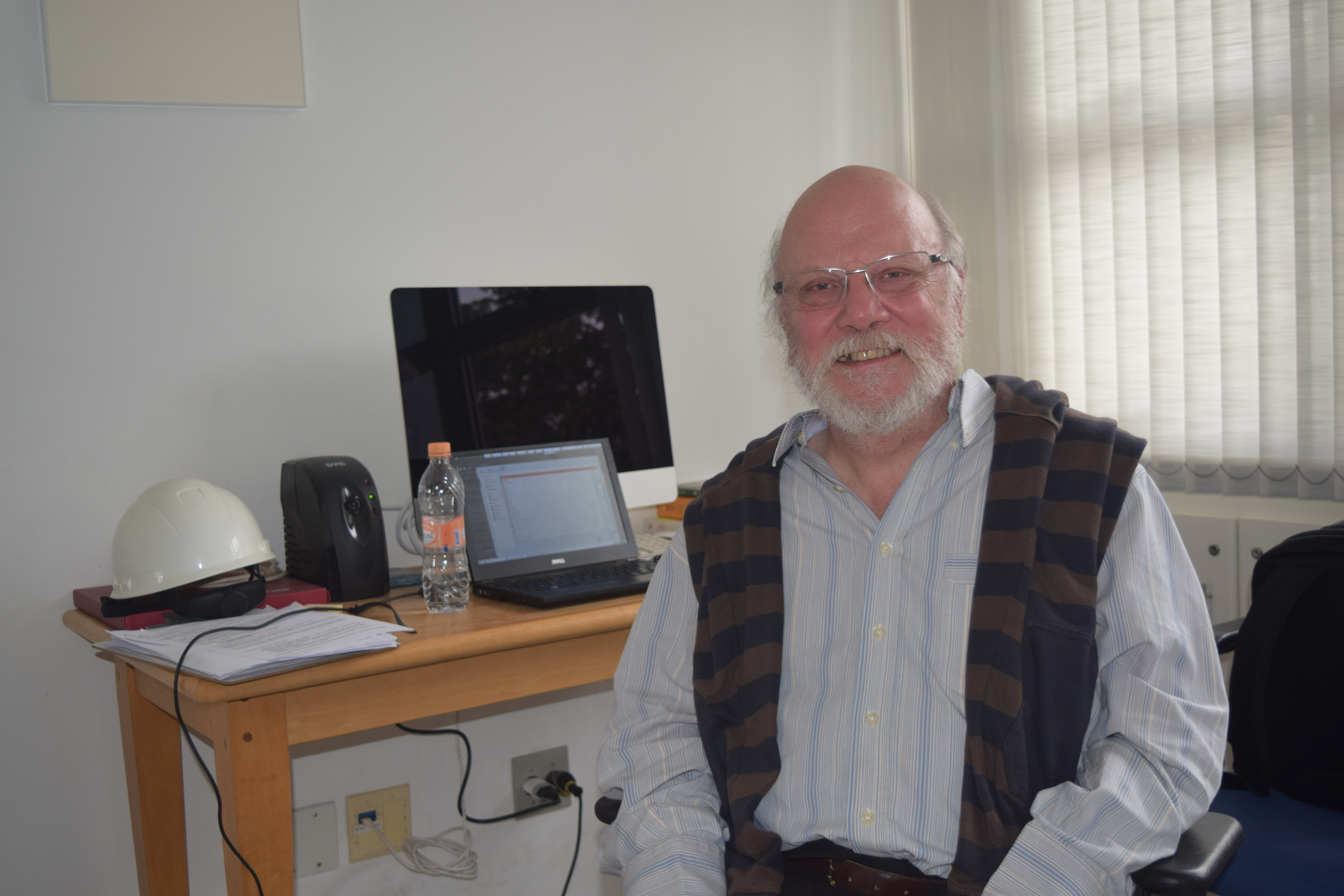
Pierre Collet, 2016

Pierre Collet (born 1948) is a French mathematical physicist, specializing in statistical mechanics, stochastic processes, and chaos theory.

In 1978, Collet received a doctorate under Jean-Pierre Eckmann at the University of Geneva, with a thesis entitled Étude du modèle hiérarchique par le groupe de renormalisation. Collet is currently Director of Research of the CNRS at the École polytechnique.

Collet is known for mathematically exact investigations of several model systems in statistical mechanics and chaos theory. He was an Invited Speaker of the ICM in 1998 in Berlin.

He is not to be confused with the University of Strasbourg's Pierre Collet, who specializes in artificial evolution and complex systems. https://cstb.icube.unistra.fr/index.php/Pierre_Collet

== Selected publications ==
=== Articles ===
- with J.-P. Eckmann: On the abundance of aperiodic behaviour for maps on the unit interval. Bull. Amer. Math. Soc. 3 (1980) Part 1:699-700. doi:10.1090/S0273-0979-1980-14799-0
- with Servet Martínez and Bernard Schmitt: On the enhancement of diffusion by chaos, escape rates and stochastic instability. Trans. Amer. Math. Soc. 351 (1999) 2875–2897. doi:10.1090/S0002-9947-99-02023-1
- with J.-P. Eckmann: Liapunov multipliers and decay of correlations in dynamical systems, Journal Stat. Phys., vol. 115, 2004, pp. 217–254 doi:10.1023/B:JOSS.0000019817.71073.61
- Some aspects of the central limit theorem and related topics. Harmonic Analysis and Rational Approximation: Their Roles in Signals, Control and Dynamical Systems, Lecture Notes in Control and Information Sciences, vol. 327, Springer Verlag 2006, pp. 105–127 doi:10.1007/11601609_7
- with Servet Martinez and Jaime San Martin: Ratio limit theorem for parabolic horn-shaped domains. Trans. Amer. Math. Soc. 358 (2006) 5059–5082. doi:10.1090/S0002-9947-06-03908-0

=== Books ===
- with J.-P. Eckmann: A renormalization group analysis of the hierarchical model in statistical mechanics, Springer Verlag, Lecture Notes in Physics, vol. 74, 1978
- with J.-P. Eckmann: Iterated maps on the interval as dynamical systems, Birkhäuser Verlag, Progress in Physics, vol. 1, 1980 (Reprint 2009)
- as editor with M. Courbage, S. Métens, A. Neishtadt, and G. Zaslavsky: Chaotic dynamics and transport in classical and quantum systems, Kluwer 2005 (Summer Institute Cargèse 2003)
- with J.-P. Eckmann: Concepts and results in chaotic dynamics: a short course, Springer Verlag, 2006.
- with J.-P. Eckmann: Instabilities and fronts in extended systems. Princeton University Press, 2014.
