= International Conference on High Energy Physics =

International scientific conference in the field of particle physics

ICHEP or International Conference on High Energy Physics is an international scientific conferences in the field of particle physics, bringing together leading theorists and experimentalists of the world. It was first held in 1950, and has been biennial since 1960. Since the first conferences of the series took place in Rochester, New York, the event is also commonly referred to as the Rochester conference. The conference is a series of international conferences organized by the C11 commission of the International Union of Pure and Applied Physics (IUPAP).

== Past conferences ==
- I Rochester (1950)
- II Rochester (1952)
- III Rochester (1952)
- IV Rochester (1954)
- V Rochester (1955)
- VI Rochester (1956)
- VII Rochester (1957)
- VIII Geneva (1958)
- IX Kiev (1959)
- X Rochester (1960)
- XI Geneva (1962)
- XII Dubna (1964)
- XIII Berkeley (1966)
- XIV Vienna (1968)
- XV Kiev (1970)
- XVI Chicago (1972)
- XVII London (1974)
- XVIII Tbilisi (1976)
- XIX Tokyo (1978)
- XX Madison (1980)
- XXI Paris (1982)
- XXII Leipzig (1984)
- XXIII Berkeley (1986)
- XXIV Munich (1988)
- XXV Singapore (1990)
- XXVI Dallas (1992)
- XXVII Glasgow (1994)
- XXVIII Warsaw (1996)
- XXIX Vancouver (1998)
- XXX Osaka (2000)
- XXXI Amsterdam (2002)
- XXXII Beijing (2004)
- XXXIII Moscow (2006)
- XXXIV Philadelphia (2008)
- XXXV Paris (2010)
- XXXVI Melbourne (2012)
- XXXVII Valencia (2014)
- XXXVIII Chicago (2016)
- XXXIX Seoul (2018)
- XL Prague (2020), virtual
- XLI Bologna (2022)
- XLII Prague (2024)
- XLIII Natal (2026)
- XLIV Bangkok (2028)
