= Francis E. Low =

American theoretical physicist (1921–2007)

- Born: October 27, 1921; New York City, U.S.
- Died: February 16, 2007 (aged 85); Haverford, Pennsylvania, U.S.
- Education: Columbia University
- Known for: Gell-Mann and Low theorem; Gell-Mann–Low equation; Balian–Low theorem; Renormalization group
- Spouse: Natalie Sadigur (m. 1948)
- Scientific career
- Fields: Theoretical physics
- Workplaces: MIT, University of Illinois at Urbana-Champaign
- Doctoral advisors: Hans Bethe; Aage Bohr
- Doctoral students: Louise Dolan; Mitchell Feigenbaum; Alan Guth
- Website: www.franciselowfoundation.org

Francis Eugene Low (October 27, 1921 – February 16, 2007) was an American theoretical physicist. He was an Institute Professor at MIT, and served as provost there from 1980 to 1985. He was a member of the influential JASON Defense Advisory Group.

== Biography ==
=== Early career ===
Low completed a B.S. degree at Harvard in 1942. During the Second World War, he worked on the Manhattan Project. He was based at what is now the Oak Ridge National Laboratory, working on the mathematics of uranium enrichment. He later entered the United States Army and served in the 10th Mountain Division.

After the war, Low completed his studies at Columbia University, earning a Ph.D. in physics in 1950. He then worked at the Institute for Advanced Study in Princeton, New Jersey, before taking up a faculty position at the University of Illinois.

=== Career at MIT ===
Low joined the MIT physics faculty in 1957. There his Ph.D. students included Alan Guth, Mitchell Feigenbaum and Robert K. Logan.

He was a director of MIT's Center for Theoretical Physics and the Laboratory for Nuclear Science.

In 1969, Low helped found the Union of Concerned Scientists, and briefly served as its chairman. He stepped down after a disagreement with other members, who refused to consider studying whether nuclear reactors could be made safe and reliable.

In 1980, Low was appointed provost of MIT. During his five-year tenure, he was instrumental in bringing the Whitehead Institute to MIT, and expanded humanities education at the Institute.

Low retired from MIT in 1991, but continued to teach for another few years. His text Classical Field Theory: Electromagnetism and Gravitation was published in 1997 by John Wiley & Sons.

=== Personal life ===
In 1948, Low married Natalie Sadigur. Low had a son Peter, two daughters, Julie and Margaret, and six grandsons; he liked to joke that this was statistically improbable. He became a widower in 2003.

== See also ==
- MIT Physics Department
