= Period-doubling bifurcation =

Event in dynamical systems theory

In dynamical systems theory, a period-doubling bifurcation occurs when a slight change in a system's parameters causes a new periodic trajectory to emerge from an existing periodic trajectory—the new one having double the period of the original. With the doubled period, it takes twice as long (or, in a discrete dynamical system, twice as many iterations) for the numerical values visited by the system to repeat themselves.

A period-halving bifurcation occurs when a system switches to a new behavior with half the period of the original system.

A period-doubling cascade is an infinite sequence of period-doubling bifurcations. Such cascades are one route by which dynamical systems can develop chaos. In hydrodynamics, they are one of the possible routes to turbulence.

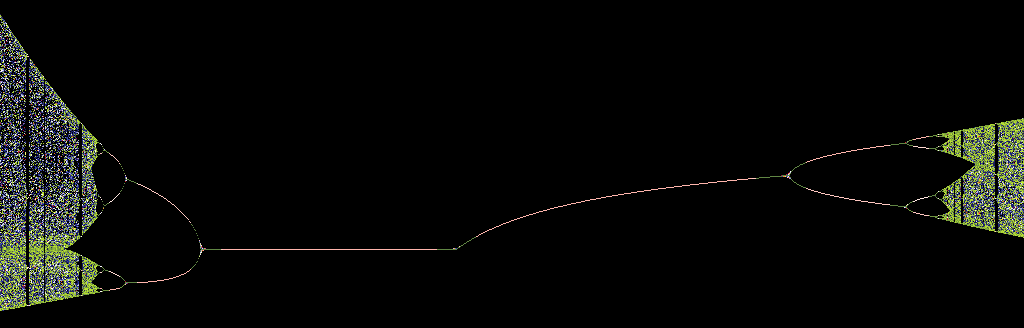
Period-halving bifurcations (L) leading to order, followed by period-doubling bifurcations (R) leading to chaos.

== Examples ==
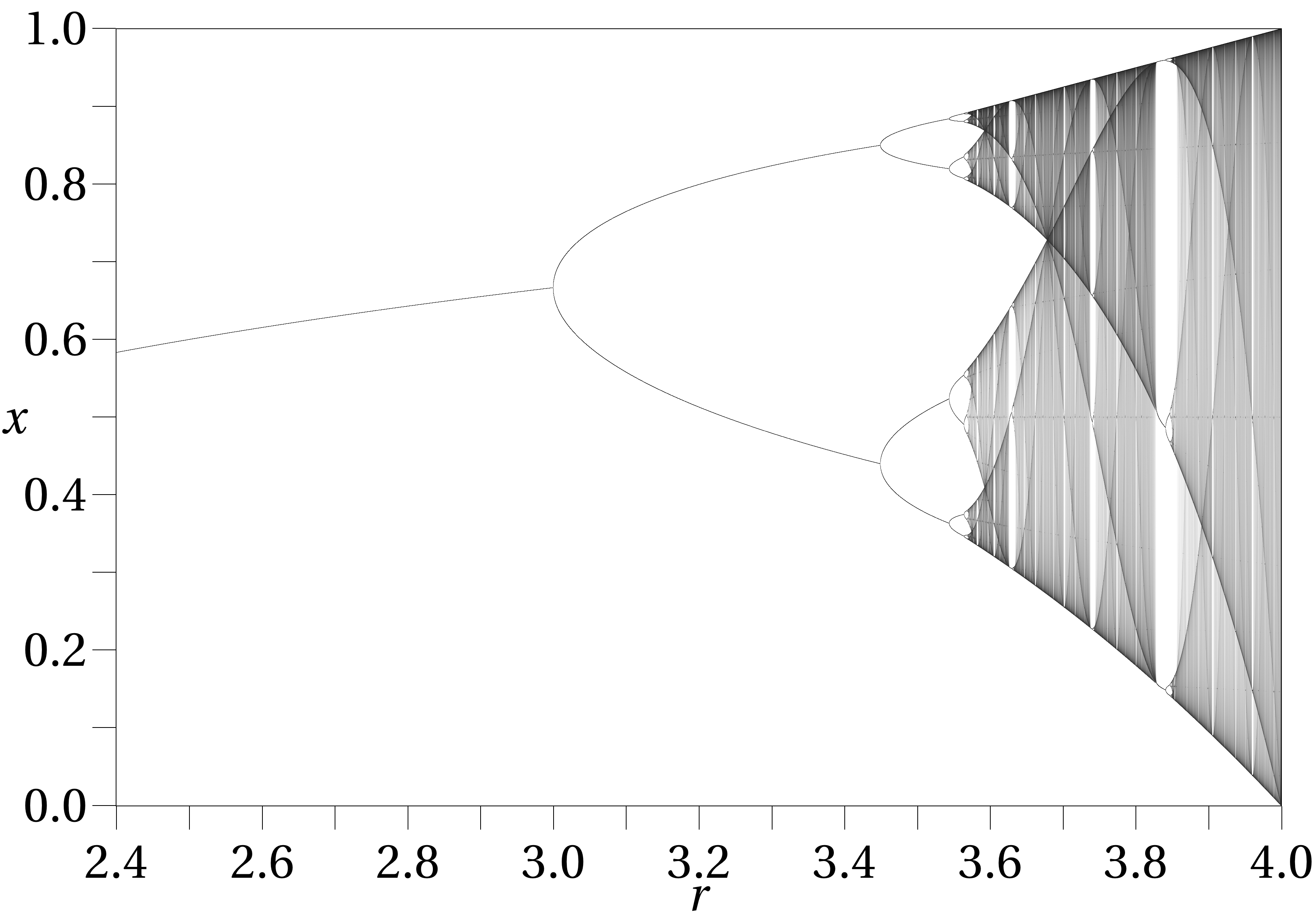
Bifurcation diagram for the logistic map. It shows the attractor values, like $x_*$ and $x'_*$, as a function of the parameter $r$.

=== Logistic map ===
The logistic map is

$$x_{n+1} = r x_n (1 - x_n)$$

where $x_n$ is a function of the (discrete) time $n = 0, 1, 2, \ldots$. The parameter $r$ is assumed to lie in the interval $[0,4]$, in which case $x_n$ is bounded on $[0,1]$.

For $r$ between 1 and 3, $x_n$ converges to the stable fixed point $x_* = (r-1)/r$. Then, for $r$ between 3 and 3.44949, $x_n$ converges to a permanent oscillation between two values $x_*$ and $x'_*$ that depend on $r$. As $r$ grows larger, oscillations between 4 values, then 8, 16, 32, etc. appear. These period doublings culminate at $r \approx 3.56995$, beyond which more complex regimes appear. As $r$ increases, there are some intervals where most starting values will converge to one or a small number of stable oscillations, such as near $r=3.83$, where there is a stable period-three solution.

In the interval where the period is $2^n$ for some positive integer $n$, not all the points actually have period $2^n$. These are single points, rather than intervals. These points are said to be in unstable orbits, since nearby points do not approach the same orbit as them.

=== Kuramoto–Sivashinsky equation ===
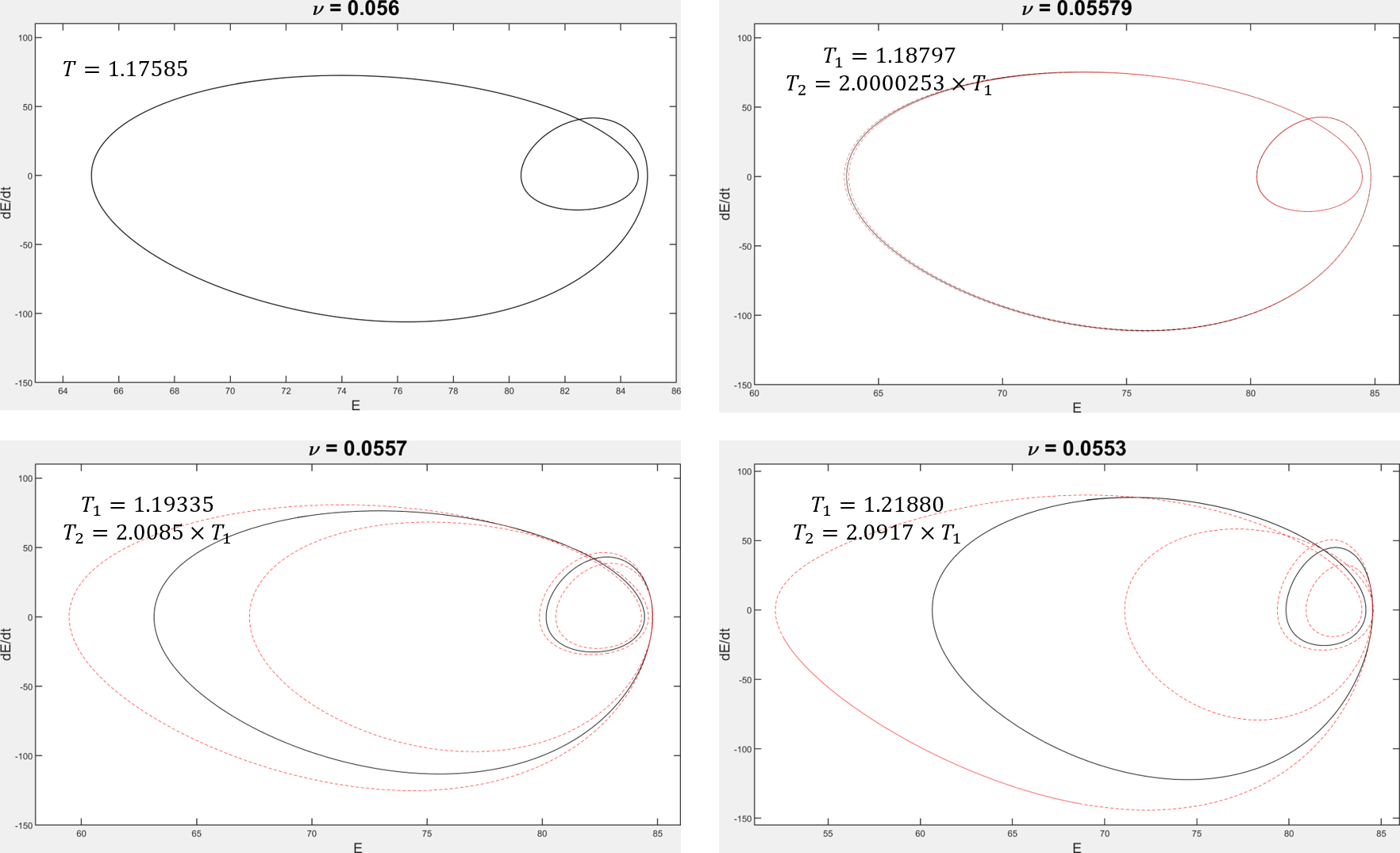
Period doubling in the Kuramoto–Sivashinsky equation with periodic boundary conditions. The curves depict solutions of the Kuramoto–Sivashinsky equation projected onto the energy phase plane (E, dE/dt), where E is the L^{2}-norm of the solution. For ν = 0.056, there exists a periodic orbit with period T ≈ 1.1759. Near ν ≈ 0.0558, this solution splits into 2 orbits, which further separate as ν is decreased. Exactly at the transitional value of ν, the new orbit (red-dashed) has double the period of the original. (However, as ν increases further, the ratio of periods deviates from exactly 2.)

The Kuramoto–Sivashinsky equation is an example of a spatiotemporally continuous dynamical system that exhibits period doubling. It is one of the most well-studied nonlinear partial differential equations, originally introduced as a model of flame front propagation.

The one-dimensional Kuramoto–Sivashinsky equation is

$$u_t + u u_x + u_{xx} + \nu \, u_{xxxx} = 0$$

A common choice for boundary conditions is spatial periodicity: $u(x + 2 \pi, t) = u(x,t)$.

For large values of $\nu$, $u(x,t)$ evolves toward steady (time-independent) solutions or simple periodic orbits. As $\nu$ is decreased, the dynamics eventually develops chaos. The transition from order to chaos occurs via a cascade of period-doubling bifurcations, one of which is illustrated in the figure.

=== Logistic map for a modified Phillips curve ===
Consider the following logistical map for a modified Phillips curve:

$\pi_{t} = f(u_{t}) + b \pi_{t}^e$

$\pi_{t+1} = \pi_{t}^e + c (\pi_{t} - \pi_{t}^e)$

$f(u) = \beta_{1} + \beta_{2} e^{-u} \,$

$b > 0, 0 \leq c \leq 1, \frac {df} {du} < 0$

where :

- $\pi$ is the actual inflation
- $\pi^e$ is the expected inflation,
- u is the level of unemployment,
- $m - \pi$ is the money supply growth rate.

Keeping $\beta_{1} = -2.5, \ \beta_{2} = 20, \ c = 0.75$ and varying $b$, the system undergoes period-doubling bifurcations and ultimately becomes chaotic.

== Experimental observation ==
Period doubling has been observed in a number of experimental systems. There is also experimental evidence of period-doubling cascades. For example, sequences of 4 period doublings have been observed in the dynamics of convection rolls in water and mercury. Similarly, 4-5 doublings have been observed in certain nonlinear electronic circuits. However, the experimental precision required to detect the i^{th} doubling event in a cascade increases exponentially with i, making it difficult to observe more than 5 doubling events in a cascade.

== See also ==
- List of chaotic maps
- Complex quadratic map
- Feigenbaum constants
- Universality (dynamical systems)
- Sharkovskii's theorem
