= Rabindra Mohapatra =

Indian American theoretical physicist (born 1944)

Rabindra Nath Mohapatra (born 1 September 1944) is an Indian American theoretical physicist, known for his work on the seesaw mechanism in neutrino physics.

Mohapatra was born in the small village Musagadia in Mayurbhanj State. He studied at Utkal University in Bhubaneswar (bachelor's degree 1964) and the University of Delhi (master's degree 1966). In 1969, he earned his PhD under Robert Marshak at the University of Rochester. Subsequently, he was a post-doc at Stony Brook University and at the University of Maryland. In 1974, he became an assistant professor and in 1976 associate professor at City College of CUNY under Bunji Sakita. In the academic year 1980/1 he was a visiting professor at Max Planck Institute for Physics. Since 1983 he has been a professor at the University of Maryland. He was a visiting professor at CERN (1976, 1981, 1985), at SLAC, at Los Alamos National Laboratory, and at Brookhaven National Laboratory. From 2005 to 2007 he was a visiting professor at the Technical University of Munich.

Mohapatra works on GUTs, unified theories of elementary particles, and neutrino physics. In particular, he, with G. Senjanovic, developed in the 1970s left-right symmetric unified theories (which are then spontaneously broken to the observed theories of electroweak interactions with parity violation.) with prediction of a neutrino mass.

In 1980/81 Mohapatra was an Alexander von Humboldt Fellow and in 2005 he received the Humboldt Prize. In 2009, he received an honorary doctorate from North Orissa University in India (2009). Since 1987 he has been a member of the Indian Academy of Sciences.

== Works ==
- Unification and Supersymmetry – the frontiers of Quark-Lepton Physics. Springer 1986, 1991, 3rd edn. 2003, ISBN 0387955348
- with Palash Pal: Massive Neutrinos in Physics and Astrophysics. World Scientific, 1991, 1998, 3rd edn. 2004
- As editor with C. Lai: Selected Papers on gauge theories and fundamental interactions. World Scientific 1981

. The Neutrino Story: One tiny particles grand role in the cosmos Springer Nature (2020)
