= Kenneth Young (physicist) =

Chinese physicist

Kenneth Young (楊綱凱 1947) is a professor of physics at the Chinese University of Hong Kong (CUHK). He obtained his BSc in Physics in 1969, and his PhD in Physics and Mathematics at the California Institute of Technology, USA. He took a position at CUHK in 1973, and embarked on a highly regarded career as a theoretical physicist. He has produced extensive research in elementary particles, field theory, high energy phenomenology and dissipative systems. Young has contributed greatly to the development of higher education in Hong Kong, administering grants, educational program development, and worked to develop both Chinese and international professional associations by assuming various responsibilities during their development. In the later stages of his career Young has moved away from administration roles in universities, and toward direct teaching of students. He reflects that "one has to have passion in one’s subject. You cannot disguise it and it would help tremendously if the students could feel and see you have it in you. It makes teaching all the more effective." He is also a proponent of contextual teaching in physics.

== Awards and honours ==
- Founding Master-Designate of CW Chu College
- Pro-Vice-Chancellor, CUHK
- Trustee of the Croucher Foundation
- Fellow of the American Physical Society
- Vice-Chancellor’s Exemplary Teaching Award, CUHK (2004)
- Chairman of the Hong Kong Research Grants Council (2004)
- Member of the International Eurasian Academy of Sciences
- Member of the University Grants Committee, Hong Kong Special Administrative Region
- Secretary and then Vice-President of the Association of Asia Pacific Physical Societies
- Vice Chairman of the Board of Adjudicators for the Shaw Prize

== Selected publications ==
- A. Maassen van den Brink, K. Young and M.H. Yung, "Eigenvector expansion and Petermann factor for ohmically damped oscillators", Journal of Physics A, Vol. 39, pp. 3725–3740 (2006).
- T.S. Lo, S.S.M. Wong and K. Young, "Determination of a finite-range potential from discrete phase-shift data by inverse scattering", Physical Review Letters, Vol. 37, pp. 9501–9513 (2004).
- E.S.C. Ching, P.T. Leung, A. Maassen van den Brink, W.M. Suen, S.S. Tong and K. Young, "Quasinormal-mode expansion for waves in open systems", Reviews of Modern Physics, Vol. 70, pp. 1545–1554 (1998).
- P.T. Leung, Y.T. Liu, W.M. Suen, C.Y. Tam and K. Young, "Quasinormal Modes of Dirty Black Holes", Physical Review Letters, Vol. 78, pp. 2894–2897 (1997).
- E.S.C. Ching, P.T. Leung, W.M. Suen and K. Young, "Late-Time Tail of Wave Propagation on Curved Space Time", Physical Review Letters, Vol. 74, pp. 2414–2417 (1995).
