= Universality (dynamical systems) =

Concept in statistical mechanics

In statistical mechanics, universality is the observation that there are properties for a large class of systems that are independent of the dynamical details of the system. Systems display universality in a scaling limit, when a large number of interacting parts come together. The modern meaning of the term was introduced by Leo Kadanoff in the 1960s, but a simpler version of the concept was already implicit in the van der Waals equation and in the earlier Landau theory of phase transitions, which did not incorporate scaling correctly.

The term is slowly gaining a broader usage in several fields of mathematics, including combinatorics and probability theory, whenever the quantitative features of a structure (such as asymptotic behaviour) can be deduced from a few global parameters appearing in the definition, without requiring knowledge of the details of the system.

The renormalization group provides an intuitively appealing, albeit mathematically non-rigorous, explanation of universality. It classifies operators in a statistical field theory into relevant and irrelevant. Relevant operators are those responsible for perturbations to the free energy (analagously the Lagrangian in quantum field theory) that will affect the continuum limit, and can be seen at long distances. Irrelevant operators are those that only change the short-distance details. The collection of scale-invariant statistical theories define the universality classes, and the finite-dimensional list of coefficients of relevant operators parametrize the near-critical behavior.

== Universality in statistical mechanics ==
The notion of universality originated in the study of phase transitions in statistical mechanics. A phase transition occurs when a material changes its properties in a dramatic way: water, as it is heated boils and turns into vapor; or a magnet, when heated, loses its magnetism. Phase transitions are characterized by an order parameter, such as the density or the magnetization, that changes as a function of a parameter of the system, such as the temperature. The special value of the parameter at which the system changes its phase is the system's critical point. For systems that exhibit universality, the closer the parameter is to its critical value, the less sensitively the order parameter depends on the details of the system.

If the parameter β is critical at the value β_{c}, then the order parameter a will be well approximated by

$$a=a_0 \left\vert \beta-\beta_c \right\vert^\alpha.$$

The exponent α is a critical exponent of the system. The remarkable discovery made in the second half of the twentieth century was that very different systems had the same critical exponents .

In 1975, Mitchell Feigenbaum discovered universality in iterated maps.

== Examples ==
Universality gets its name because it is seen in a large variety of physical systems. Examples of universality include:

- Avalanches in piles of sand. The likelihood of an avalanche is in power-law proportion to the size of the avalanche, and avalanches are seen to occur at all size scales. This is termed "self-organized criticality" .
- The formation and propagation of cracks and tears in materials ranging from steel to rock to paper. The variations of the direction of the tear, or the roughness of a fractured surface, are in power-law proportion to the size scale .
- The electrical breakdown of dielectrics, which resemble cracks and tears.
- The percolation of fluids through disordered media, such as petroleum through fractured rock beds, or water through filter paper, such as in chromatography. Power-law scaling connects the rate of flow to the distribution of fractures .
- The diffusion of molecules in solution, and the phenomenon of diffusion-limited aggregation.
- The distribution of rocks of different sizes in an aggregate mixture that is being shaken (with gravity acting on the rocks) .
- The appearance of critical opalescence in fluids near a phase transition.

== Theoretical overview ==
One of the important developments in materials science in the 1970s and the 1980s was the realization that statistical field theory, similar to quantum field theory, could be used to provide a microscopic theory of universality . The core observation was that, for all of the different systems, the behaviour at a phase transition is described by a continuum field, and that the same statistical field theory will describe different systems. The scaling exponents in all of these systems can be derived from the field theory alone, and are known as critical exponents.

The key observation is that near a phase transition or critical point, disturbances occur at all size scales, and thus one should look for an explicitly scale-invariant theory to describe the phenomena, as seems to have been put in a formal theoretical framework first by Pokrovsky and Patashinsky in 1965. Universality is a by-product of the fact that there are relatively few scale-invariant theories. For any one specific physical system, the detailed description may have many scale-dependent parameters and aspects. However, as the phase transition is approached, the scale-dependent parameters play less and less of an important role, and the scale-invariant parts of the physical description dominate. Thus, a simplified, and often exactly solvable, model can be used to approximate the behaviour of these systems near the critical point.

Percolation may be modeled by a random electrical resistor network, with electricity flowing from one side of the network to the other. The overall resistance of the network is seen to be described by the average connectivity of the resistors in the network .

The formation of tears and cracks may be modeled by a random network of electrical fuses. As the electric current flow through the network is increased, some fuses may pop, but on the whole, the current is shunted around the problem areas, and uniformly distributed. However, at a certain point (at the phase transition) a cascade failure may occur, where the excess current from one popped fuse overloads the next fuse in turn, until the two sides of the net are completely disconnected and no more current flows .

To perform the analysis of such random-network systems, one considers the stochastic space of all possible networks (that is, the canonical ensemble), and performs a summation (integration) over all possible network configurations. As in the previous discussion, each given random configuration is understood to be drawn from the pool of all configurations with some given probability distribution; the role of temperature in the distribution is typically replaced by the average connectivity of the network .

The expectation values of operators, such as the rate of flow, the heat capacity, and so on, are obtained by integrating over all possible configurations. This act of integration over all possible configurations is the point of commonality between systems in statistical mechanics and quantum field theory. In particular, the language of the renormalization group may be applied to the discussion of the random network models. In the 1990s and 2000s, stronger connections between the statistical models and conformal field theory were uncovered. The study of universality remains a vital area of research.

== Applications to other fields ==
Like other concepts from statistical mechanics (such as entropy and master equations), universality has proven a useful construct for characterizing distributed systems at a higher level, such as multi-agent systems. The term has been applied to multi-agent simulations, where the system-level behavior exhibited by the system is independent of the degree of complexity of the individual agents, being driven almost entirely by the nature of the constraints governing their interactions. In network dynamics, universality refers to the fact that despite the diversity of nonlinear dynamic models, which differ in many details, the observed behavior of many different systems adheres to a set of universal laws. These laws are independent of the specific details of each system.
