= Zeitschrift für Physik =

Scientific journal (1920–1997)

- Cover of a 1924 edition
- Discipline: Physics
- Language: German

Publication details
- History: 1920–1997
- Publisher: Springer Berlin Heidelberg (Germany)

Standard abbreviations
- ISO 4: Z. Phys.

Indexing
- Z. Phys. A
- CODEN: ZPAHEX
- ISSN: 0939-7922 (print); 1431-5831 (web)
- Z. Phys. B
- CODEN: ZPCMDN
- ISSN: 0722-3277 (print); 1431-584X (web)
- Z. Phys. C
- CODEN: ZPCFD2
- ISSN: 0170-9739 (print); 1431-5858 (web)
- Z. Phys. D
- CODEN: ZDACE2
- ISSN: 0178-7683 (print); 1431-5866 (web)

Links
- Z. Phys. A; Z. Phys. B; Z. Phys. C; Z. Phys. D

Zeitschrift für Physik (English: Journal for Physics) is a defunct series of German peer-reviewed physics journals established in 1920 by Springer Berlin Heidelberg. The series ended publication in 1997, when it merged with other journals to form the new European Physical Journal series. It had expanded to four parts over the years.

== History ==
- Zeitschrift für Physik (1920–1975 ISSN 0044-3328), The first three issues were published as a supplement to Verhandlungen der Deutschen Physikalischen Gesellschaft. The journal split in parts A and B in 1975.

- Zeitschrift für Physik A (1975–1997). The original subtitle was Atoms and Nuclei (ISSN 0340-2193). In 1986, it split into Zeitschrift für Physik A: Atomic Nuclei (ISSN 0939-7922) and Zeitschrift für Physik D: Atoms, Molecules and Clusters. Zeitschrift für Physik A continues as the European Physical Journal A.

- Zeitschrift für Physik B (1975–1997) resulted from the split of Zeitschrift für Physik and the merger of Physics of Condensed Matter (ISSN 0340-2347). Physics of Condensed Matter was itself the continuation of Physik der Kondensierten Materie ISSN 0031-9236). The original subtitle of Zeitschrift für Physik B was Condensed Matter and Quanta (ISSN 0340-224X) but changed to Condensed Matter (ISSN 0722-3277) in 1980. Zeitschrift für Physik B merged with Journal de Physique I (ISSN 1155-4304) to form European Physical Journal B.

- Zeitschrift für Physik C: Particles and Fields (1979–1997, ISSN 0170-9739), continuing as the European Physical Journal C.

- Zeitschrift für Physik D: Atoms, Molecules and Clusters (1986–1997, ISSN 0178-7683). Zeitschrift für Physik D merged with Journal de Physique II (ISSN 1155-4312 to form European Physical Journal D.

In 1925, Werner Heisenberg published, "Über quantentheoretische Umdeutung kinematischer und mechanischer Beziehungen" ("Quantum theoretical re-interpretation of kinematic and mechanical relations") in Zeitschrift für Physik. Heisenberg, Max Born and Pascual Jordan submit in autumn 1925 their papers "Zur Quantenmechanik" setting out their matrix formulation of quantum mechanics, to Zeitschrift für Physik.

== See also ==
- Physikalische Zeitschrift
