= Annales de chimie et de physique =

- Discipline: Physics, Chemistry
- Language: French

Publication details
- Former name: Annales de chimie
- History: 1789–1914

Standard abbreviations
- ISO 4: Ann. Chim. Phys.

Indexing
- Annales de chimie et de physique
- ISSN: 0365-1444
- OCLC no.: 07077607
- Annales de chimie
- ISSN: 0003-3936
- OCLC no.: 05504346

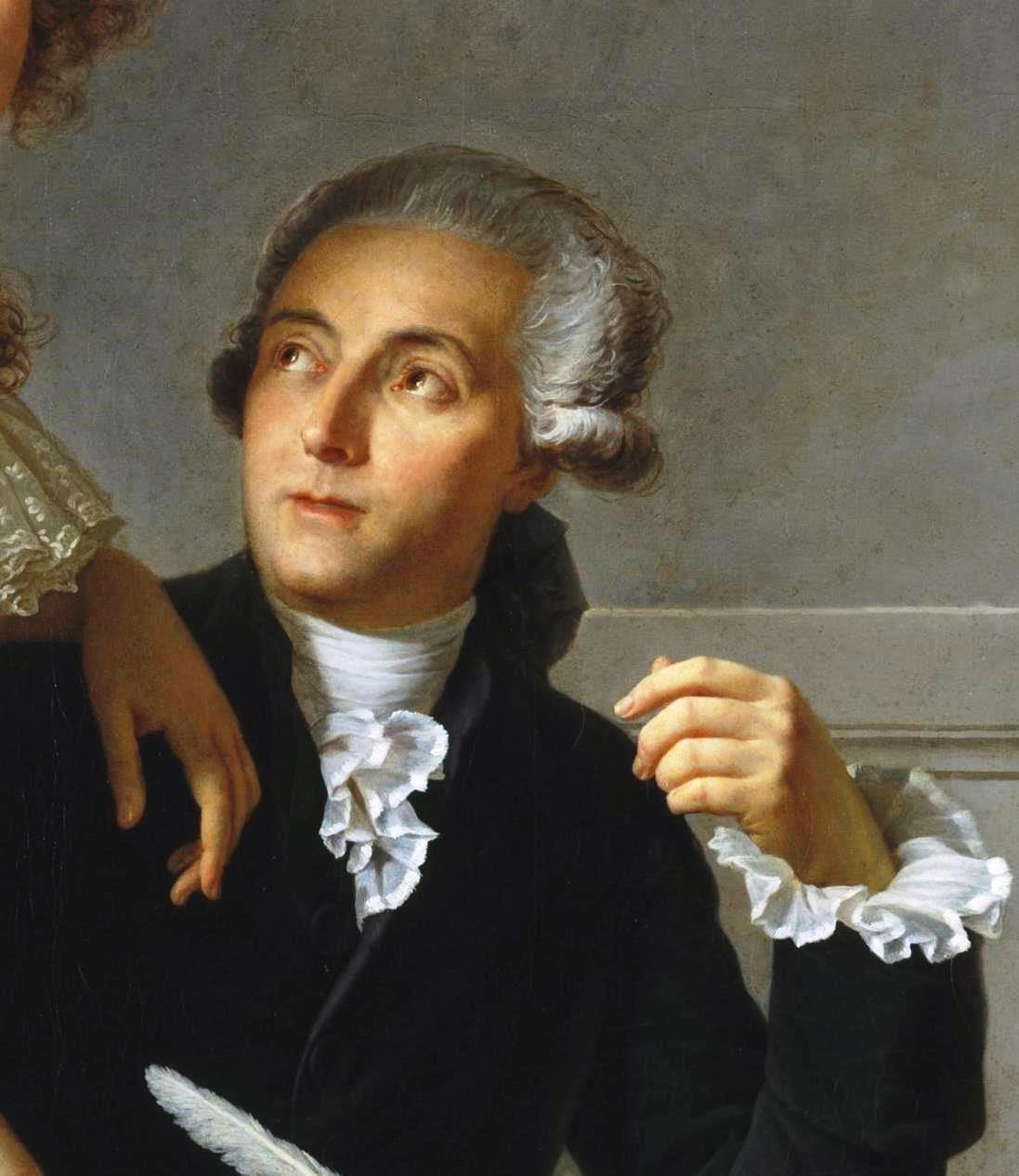
Antoine Lavoisier was one of the early editors of the journal

Annales de chimie et de physique (French pronunciation: [anal də ʃimi e də fizik], lit. 'Annals of Chemistry and Physics') is a scientific journal founded in Paris, France, in 1789 under the title Annales de chimie. One of the early editors was the French chemist Antoine Lavoisier. Lavoisier, an aristocrat, was guillotined in May 1794, ostensibly for tax fraud: and the journal was not published from 1794 to 1796 while the Reign of Terror was at its height under the French Revolution.

Pierre Adet was secretary to the periodical. He proved that glacial acetic acid and vinegar acetic acid were the same substance. In 1815, it became the Annales de chimie et de physique, and was published under that name for the next 100 years.

In 1914, it split into two successor journals. The first one, Annales de physique, was latterly published by EDP Sciences under the same name up to 2009, when it became integrated in the European Physical Journal series as the European Physical Journal H – Historical Perspectives on Contemporary Physics. The second successor, Annales de chimie, later became Annales de chimie: Science des matériaux in 1978; from 1998 to 2004, it was published online by Elsevier, and since 2004, it has been managed online by the Éditions Lavoisier publishing company. Despite the name changes, the volume numbering maintained continuity between the different titles, both for the physics journal and the chemistry journal.

== Notable works ==
- A. Fresnel, 1818, "Mémoire sur la diffraction de la lumière" ("Memoir on the diffraction of light"), deposited 29 July 1818, "crowned" 15 March 1819, published (with appended notes) in Mémoires de l'Académie Royale des Sciences de l'Institut de France, vol. V (for 1821 & 1822, printed 1826), pp. 339–475; reprinted (with notes) in Fresnel, 1866–70, vol. 1, pp. 247–383; partly translated as "Fresnel's prize memoir on the diffraction of light", in Crew, 1900, pp. 81–144.
- D.F.J. Arago and A. Fresnel, 1819, "Mémoire sur l'action que les rayons de lumière polarisée exercent les uns sur les autres", Annales de Chimie et de Physique, Ser. 2, vol. 10, pp. 288–305, March 1819; reprinted in Fresnel, 1866–70, vol. 1, pp. 509–22; translated as "On the action of rays of polarized light upon each other", in Crew, 1900, pp. 145–55.

== See also ==
- Pierre Adet

== Sources and further reading ==
- Early history (in French), sourced from: Dictionnaire des journaux (1600–1789) sous la direction de Jean SGARD. Paris, Universitas, 1991. (Notice A.-M. CHOUILLET)
- The Development of Modern Chemistry, pp. 273, in the chapter 'The Diffusion of Chemical Knowledge', Aaron John Ihde, Courier Dover Publications, 1984
- In the Shadow of Lavoisier: The 'Annales de Chimie' and the Establishment of a New Science. Maurice Crosland. 1994
