= European Physical Journal D =

- Discipline: Atomic Physics
- Language: English
- Edited by: A. Beige, S. Ptasinska and A.V. Solov'yov

Publication details
- History: 1998–present
- Publisher: Springer Science+Business Media, EDP Sciences, Società Italiana di Fisica
- Frequency: Monthly
- Impact factor: 1.425 (2020)

Standard abbreviations
- ISO 4: Eur. Phys. J. D

Indexing
- ISSN: 1434-6060 (print); 1434-6079 (web)

Links
- Journal homepage

The European Physical Journal D: Atomic, Molecular, Optical and Plasma Physics is an academic journal recognized by the European Physical Society, presenting new and original research results.

== Scope ==
The main areas covered are:

- Atomic Physics
- Molecular Physics and Chemical Physics
- Atomic and Molecular Collisions
- Clusters and Nanostructures
- Cold Matter and Quantum Gases
- Plasma Physics
- Nonlinear Dynamics
- Optical Phenomena and Photonics
- Quantum Optics
- Quantum Information
- Ultraintense and Ultrashort Laser Fields

The range of topics covered in these areas is extensive, from Molecular Interaction and Reactivity to Spectroscopy and Thermodynamics of Clusters, from Atomic Optics to Bose-Einstein Condensation to Femtochemistry.

== History ==
The EPJ D arose from various predecessors: Il Nuovo Cimento (Section D), Journal de Physique, and Zeitschrift für Physik D. Prior to 1998, this journal was named Zeitschrift für Physik D: Atoms, Molecules and Clusters.

Until 2003, Ingolf Hertel was the editor-in-chief of EPJ D. From May 2003 on EPJ D had two editors-in-chief: Tito Arecchi and Jean-Michel Raimond. In January 2004, Arecchi stepped down and Franco A. Gianturco took over his position.

In 2009, the newly appointed (third) editor-in-chief, Kurt Becker, took on the responsibility for promoting the plasma physics coverage of the journal.

As of 2018, three editors-in-chief are Tommaso Calarco (Forschungszentrum Jülich, Germany), Holger Kersten (Christian-Albrechts-Universität zu Kiel, Germany) and Andrey V. Solov'yov (MBN Research Center, Frankfurt am Main, Germany).

== See also ==
- European Physical Journal
