= Condensed matter (disambiguation) =

Condensed matter may refer to:

- Condensed matter physics, a subdivision of the physical sciences
- Scientific journals:
  - European Physical Journal B: Condensed Matter and Complex Systems
  - Journal of Physics: Condensed Matter
  - Physics of Condensed Matter, Springer-Verlag publication until its 1975 merger into European Physical Journal
