= Flora of China (series) =

Online compilation of plants of China

Flora of China 中国植物志
- Edited by: Wu Zhengyi, Peter H. Raven & Hong Deyuan
- Country: China and USA
- Language: English
- Discipline: Botany (Flora)
- Publisher: Science Press (Beijing) & Missouri Botanical Garden (St. Louis)
- Published: 1994–2013 (online since 21 May 2004)
- No. of books: 50 volumes
- Preceded by: Flora Reipublicae Popularis Sinicae
- Followed by: Catalogue of Life China
- Website: eFloras

Flora of China is a scientific publication aimed at describing the plants native to China. It is the English-language revision of the Latin Flora Reipublicae Popularis Sinicae (FRPS, literally, "Flora of the People’s Republic of China", 中国植物志) .

The project is a collaborative scientific effort to publish the first modern English-language account of the 31,000 species of vascular plants of China. This number includes about 8,000 species of medicinal and economically important plants and about 7,500 species of trees and shrubs. Flora of China describes and otherwise documents these species. The revision in Flora of China uses taxonomy reflecting the current understanding of each group. The sequence of families is a modified Englerian system, similar to that used in FRPS; however, the circumscription of some families reflects the present understanding of the groups. It is intended that all the vascular plants of China will be covered, including descriptions, identification keys, essential synonymy, phenology, provincial distribution in China, brief statements on extra-Chinese distribution, and remarks regarding the circumscription of problematic taxa.

Flora of China Illustrations series, a companion set of volumes, illustrated ca. 65% of species documented in Flora of China. Many of the illustration volumes are largest collections of line drawings of related families/genera ever published in the world.

In addition, botanical names, literature, geographical distribution inside and outside China, and endemism status are available in the online Flora of China Checklist. This checklist and Missouri Botanical Garden's Tropicos database together provide interfaces for querying the nomenclatural and distributional data and illustrations.

The data from the published volumes are presented online as separate treatments of families, genera, and species. These treatments are searchable in eFloras on names and various other information. Interactive identification keys are available for large genera.

Close international collaboration on the research, writing, review, and editing characterizes the production of the Flora. Chinese authors work together with their non-Chinese colleagues from 29 countries (Argentina, Armenia, Australia, Austria, Belgium, Brazil, Canada, Czech Republic, Denmark, Finland, France, Germany, Greece, Ireland, Japan, Korea, Mexico, Netherlands, New Zealand, Philippines, Russia, Spain, South Africa, Sweden, Switzerland, Thailand, UK, Ukraine, and USA). The resulting draft is then reviewed by Chinese botanists, the Flora of China Editorial Committee, family specialists from around the world, and advisors on the floras of regions neighboring China to produce the best possible treatments.

The project has seven non-Chinese editorial centers at Harvard University Herbaria, the California Academy of Sciences, the Smithsonian Institution, the Royal Botanic Garden Edinburgh, the Royal Botanic Gardens, Kew, the Muséum National d'Histoire Naturelle (Paris), and the Missouri Botanical Garden, the organizational and coordination center of the project. The four Chinese centers are the CAS Institute of Botany (Beijing), the Kunming Institute of Botany, the Jiangsu Institute of Botany (Nanjing), and the South China Botanical Garden (Guangzhou). Some 478 scientists from throughout the world have cooperated in the preparation of individual treatments in the Flora.

Kai Larsen (1926–2012) was one of the advisors for the series.

Work on Flora of China was declared complete in 2013. Its successor is the Catalog of Life China (Chinese: 中国生物物种名录; lit. 'Chinese biological species catalog'), which also subsumes Fauna Sinica and Flora Sporophytae Sinicae.

== Reception ==
Paul Ormerod noted that the series has made "has made studies [of Chinese flora] considerably easier for those not fluent in reading Chinese". A reviewer of Volume 6 praised the series, writing "I can wholeheartedly recommend the Flora of China series to readers, both for its content and for the quality of its production". Another scholar wrote about Volume 25 that it was "an important and long-anticipated part" of the series.

== Flora Reipublicae Popularis Sinicae ==
中国植物志 Flora Reipublicae Popularis Sinicae
- Author: 300+ botanists (FRPS Editorial Committee, Chinese Academy of Sciences)
- Country: China
- Language: Simplified Chinese
- Discipline: Botany (Flora)
- Publisher: Science Press (Beijing)
- Published: September 1959 – October 2004
- No. of books: 80 volumes in 126 books
- OCLC: 2813998
- Followed by: Flora of China
- Website: www.iplant.cn/frps

The FRPS consists of 80 volumes in 126 books published from 1959–2004. It includes 301 families, 3408 genera, 31142 species of vascular plants, with 9801 pictures.。An index was published in December 2005, containing 65000 Chinese names and 120000 Latin names.

The first three volumes were published in 1959–1963. The Cultural Revolution resulted in a pause and work continued in 1973.

The FRPS received State Natural Science Award First Class in 2009.
