= Cifarelli =

Cifarelli is an Italian surname. Notable people with the surname include:

- Dominic Cifarelli (born 1979), Canadian musician
- Lucia Cifarelli (born 1970), American musician
- Luisa Cifarelli (born 1952), Italian particle physicist
- Nicholas J. Cifarelli (1928–2005), American physician
