= Presidency of John Adams =

U.S. presidential administration from 1797 to 1801

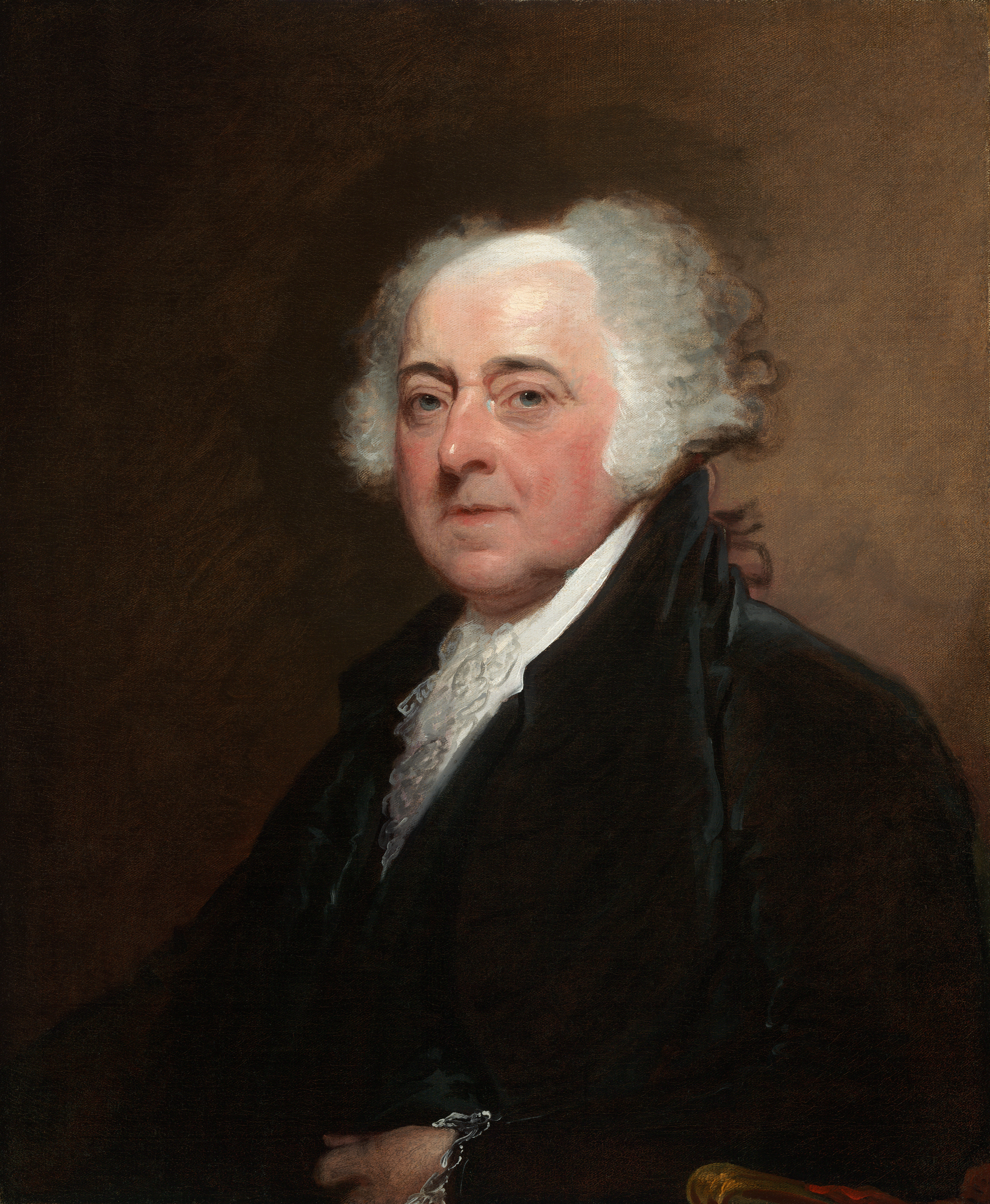
- Presidency of John Adams; March 4, 1797 – March 4, 1801
- Vice President: Thomas Jefferson
- Cabinet: See list
- Party: Federalist
- Election: 1796
- Seat: President's House; White House
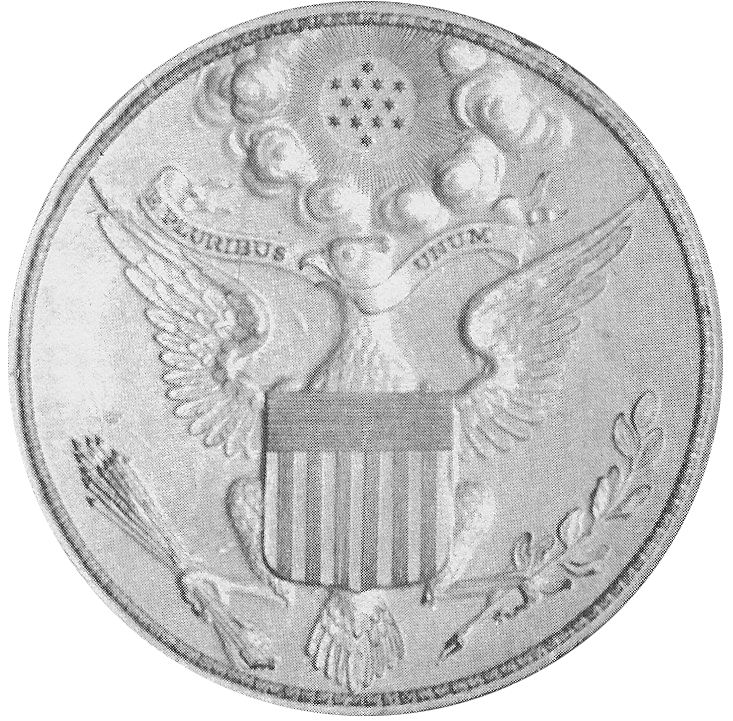
- Dorsett seal

Presidential Farewell Address, by U.S. President John Adams

John Adams served as the 2nd president of the United States from March 4, 1797, to March 4, 1801. Adams, who had served as vice president under George Washington, took office as president after winning the 1796 presidential election. The only member of the Federalist Party to ever serve as president, his presidency ended after a single term following his defeat in the 1800 presidential election. He was succeeded by Thomas Jefferson of the opposition Democratic-Republican Party.

When Adams entered office, the ongoing major European war between France and Great Britain was causing great difficulties for American merchants on the high seas and arousing intense partisanship among contending political parties nationwide. Attempts to negotiate with the French led to the XYZ Affair, in which French officials demanded bribes before they would assent to the beginning of negotiations. The XYZ Affair outraged the American public, and the United States and France engaged in an undeclared naval conflict known as the Quasi-War, which dominated the remainder of Adams's presidency. Adams presided over an expansion of the army and the navy, and the navy won several successes in the Quasi-War.

The increased expenditures associated with these actions required greater federal revenue, and Congress passed the Direct Tax of 1798. The war and its associated taxation provoked domestic unrest, resulting in incidents such as Fries's Rebellion. In response to the unrest, both foreign and domestic, the 5th Congress passed four bills, collectively known as the Alien and Sedition Acts. Signed into law by the president, these acts made it more difficult for immigrants to become U.S. citizens, allowed the president to imprison and deport non-citizens who were deemed dangerous or who were from a hostile nation, and criminalized making false statements that were critical of the federal government. The Federalist majority argued that the bills strengthened national security during a time of conflict, while the Democratic-Republicans harshly criticized the laws.

Opposition to the Quasi-War and the Alien and the Sedition Acts, as well as the intra-party rivalry between Adams and Alexander Hamilton, all contributed to Adams's loss to Jefferson in the 1800 election. Historians have difficulty assessing Adams's presidency. Samuel Eliot Morison has written that "he was by temperament unsuited for the presidency. He did know more than any other American, even James Madison, about political science; but as an administrator he was uneasy." Nonetheless, Adams was able to avoid war with France, arguing that war should be a last resort to diplomacy. In this argument, he won the nation the respect of its most powerful adversaries. Although Adams was fiercely criticized for signing the Alien and Sedition Acts, he never advocated their passage nor personally implemented them, and he pardoned the instigators of Fries's Rebellion. "Seen in this light," observed historian C. James Taylor, "Adams's legacy is one of reason, moral leadership, the rule of law, compassion, and a cautious but active foreign policy that aimed both at securing the national interest and achieving an honorable peace."

== Election of 1796 ==
The election of 1796 was the first contested American presidential election. George Washington had been elected to office unanimously in the first two presidential elections. However, during his presidency, deep philosophical differences manifested between the two leading figures in the administration—Alexander Hamilton and Thomas Jefferson. Their competing visions of domestic and foreign policy caused a rift within the administration, and led to the founding of the Federalist Party and the Democratic-Republican Party. Washington's announcement that he would not be a candidate for a third term ignited an intense partisan struggle over the presidency.

1796 electoral vote totals
Name	Party	Votes
John Adams	Federalist	71
Thomas Jefferson	Democratic-Republican	68
Thomas Pinckney	Federalist	59
Aaron Burr	Democratic-Republican	30
Samuel Adams	Democratic-Republican	15
Oliver Ellsworth	Federalist	11
George Clinton	Democratic-Republican	7
John Jay	Federalist	5
James Iredell	Federalist	3
John Henry	Democratic-Republican	2
Samuel Johnston	Federalist	2
George Washington	None	2
C. C. Pinckney	Federalist	1

Like the previous two presidential elections, no candidates were put directly before the voters in 1796. The Constitution instead provided that each state selected presidential electors, and a vote of the presidential electors selected the president. As the election took place before the ratification of the 12th Amendment, each presidential elector cast two votes for president, though electors were not allowed to cast both votes for the same person. The Constitution prescribed that the person receiving the most votes would become president, provided that they won votes from a majority of the electors, while the person with the second most electoral votes would become vice president. Voters chose the presidential electors in seven states. In the remaining nine states, they were chosen by the state's legislature.

Adams and Hamilton both wanted to lead the Federalist Party, but Vice President Adams was widely viewed as Washington's "heir apparent," and he consolidated support among his party's electors. The clear favorite of Democratic-Republicans was Thomas Jefferson, though he was reluctant to run. The Democratic-Republicans in Congress held a nominating caucus and named Jefferson and Aaron Burr as their presidential choices. Jefferson at first declined the nomination, but he finally agreed to run a few weeks later. Federalist members of Congress held an informal nominating caucus and named Adams and Thomas Pinckney as their presidential candidates. The campaign, was, for the most part, unorganized and sporadic, confined to newspaper attacks, pamphlets, and political rallies. Federalists attacked Jefferson as a Francophile and an atheist, while the Democratic-Republicans accused Adams of being an Anglophile and a monarchist.

In early November, France's ambassador to the United States, Pierre Adet, inserted himself into the political debate on behalf of Jefferson, publishing statements designed to arouse anti-British sentiment and to leave the impression that a Jefferson victory would result in improved relations with France. Meanwhile, Hamilton, desiring "a more pliant president than Adams," maneuvered to tip the election to Pinckney. He coerced South Carolina Federalist electors, who had pledged to vote for "favorite son" Pinckney, to scatter their second votes among candidates other than Adams. Hamilton's scheme was undone, however, when several New England state electors heard of it, conferred, and agreed not to vote for Pinckney.

The votes of the 138 members of the Electoral College were counted during a joint session of Congress on February 8, 1797; the top three vote recipients were: Adams 71 votes, Jefferson 69, and Pinckney 59. The balance of the votes were dispersed among Burr and nine other candidates. Almost all of Adams's votes came from Northern electors, and almost all of Jefferson's votes came from Southern electors. As President of the Senate, it fell to Adams to announce himself as president-elect and his chief opponent, Jefferson, as vice president-elect. A week later he delivered an emotional farewell speech to the body whose deliberations he had presided over for eight years. The American two-party system came into being during the run-up to the 1796 election – the only election to date in which a president and vice president were elected from opposing parties. The rivalry between New England and the South, with the middle states holding the balance of power, began to germinate at this time as well.

== Inauguration ==
Adams was inaugurated as the nation's 2nd president on March 4, 1797, in the House of Representatives Chamber of Congress Hall in Philadelphia. Chief Justice Oliver Ellsworth administered the oath of office, making Adams the first president to receive the oath from a Supreme Court chief justice.

Adams began his inaugural address with a review of the struggle for independence,

When it was first perceived, in early times, that no middle course for America remained between unlimited submission to a foreign legislature and a total independence of its claims, men of reflection were less apprehensive of danger from the formidable power of fleets and armies they must determine to resist than from those contests and dissensions which would certainly arise concerning the forms of government to be instituted over the whole and over the parts of this extensive country. Relying, however, on the purity of their intentions, the justice of their cause, and the integrity and intelligence of the people, under an overruling Providence which had so signally protected this country from the first, the representatives of this nation, then consisting of little more than half its present number, not only broke to pieces the chains which were forging and the rod of iron that was lifted up, but frankly cut asunder the ties which had bound them, and launched into an ocean of uncertainty.

The 2,308-word speech included an eloquent tribute to George Washington, a call for political unity, and a pledge to support the development of institutions of learning. To the chagrin of some of his Federalist allies, Adams also praised the French nation.

At the time he entered office, the country's population stood at around five million people, with two-thirds of those living within one hundred miles of the East Coast of the United States. The greatest population growth, however, was occurring in regions west of the Appalachian Mountains. By the end of his term, 500,000 people, principally from New England, Virginia, and Maryland, had migrated west into Kentucky, Tennessee, and the Northwest Territory.

== Administration ==
=== Cabinet ===
Adams cabinet
Office	Name	Term
President	John Adams	1797–1801
Vice President	Thomas Jefferson	1797–1801
Secretary of State	Timothy Pickering	1797–1800
John Marshall	1800–1801
Secretary of the Treasury	Oliver Wolcott Jr.	1797–1800
Samuel Dexter	1801
Secretary of War	James McHenry	1797–1800
Samuel Dexter	1800–1801
Attorney General	Charles Lee	1797–1801
Secretary of the Navy	Benjamin Stoddert	1798–1801

Aside from the appointment process, the Constitution included only a passing reference to the operation of executive branch agencies. Late in Washington's first term, the term "cabinet" began to be applied to the heads of the executive branch departments, and Washington relied on his cabinet as an advisory council. While the Constitution made it clear that the people appointed to lead these agencies answered to the president, it was silent on termination of cabinet appointments. When Adams became president, there was no precedent regarding the continued service of the previous president's top officials. Rather than seize the opportunity to use patronage to build a loyal group of advisors, Adams retained Washington's cabinet, although none of its members had ever been close to him.

Three cabinet members, Timothy Pickering, James McHenry, and Oliver Wolcott Jr., were devoted to Hamilton and referred every major policy question to him in New York. These cabinet members, in turn, presented Hamilton's recommendations to the president, and often actively worked against Adams's proposals. "The Hamiltonians by whom he is surrounded," wrote Jefferson in a May 1797 letter, "are only a little less hostile to him than to me." The other holdover from the Washington administration, Attorney General Charles Lee, worked well with Adams and remained in the cabinet for the duration of Adams's presidency. In 1798, Benjamin Stoddert of Maryland became the first Secretary of the Navy, and Stoddert emerged as one of Adams's most important advisers. As a split grew between Adams and the Hamiltonian wing of the Federalists during the second half of Adams's term, the president relied less on the advice of Pickering, McHenry, and Wolcott. Upon apprehending the scope of Hamilton's behind the scenes manipulations, Adams dismissed Pickering and McHenry in 1800, replacing them with John Marshall and Samuel Dexter, respectively.

=== Vice presidency ===
Adams and Jefferson started off cordially; they had become friends 20 years earlier, while serving together in the Second Continental Congress. On the eve of their inaugurations, they met briefly to discuss the possibility of sending Jefferson to France as part of a three-member delegation to calm the increasingly turbulent relations between the two countries. When they concluded that this would be an improper role for the vice president, they agreed on substituting Jefferson's political ally, James Madison. Shortly after the inauguration, Jefferson informed Adams that Madison was not interested in the diplomatic mission to France. Adams replied that, in any event, he would not have been able to select Madison because of pressure from within his cabinet to appoint a Federalist. That was the last time Adams consulted Jefferson on an issue of national significance. For his part, the vice president turned exclusively to his political role as leader of the Democratic-Republicans and to his governmental duty as the Senate's presiding officer.

== Judicial appointments ==
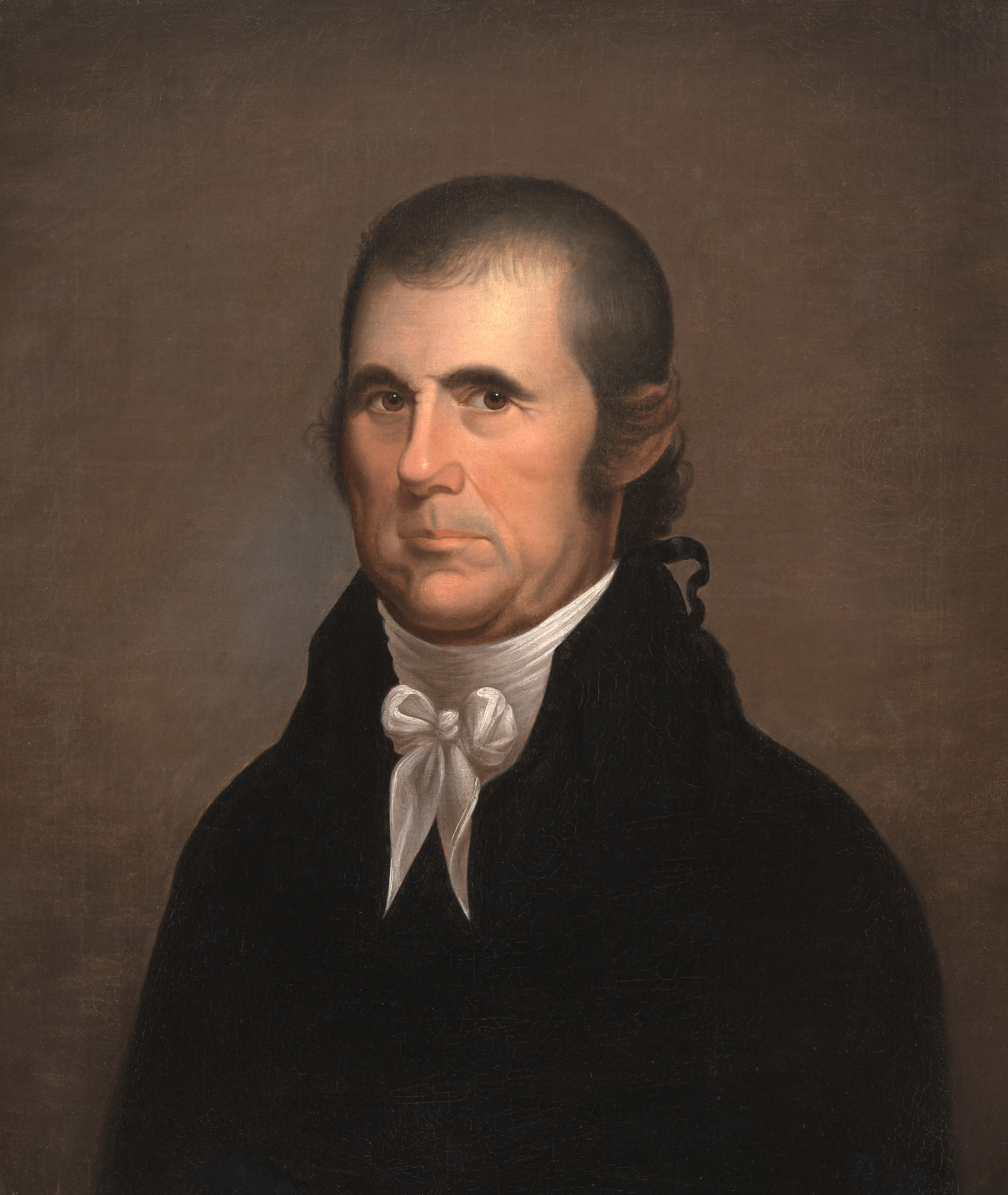
John Marshall, fourth Chief Justice of the United States, 1801–1835

President Adams filled three Supreme Court vacancies. In December 1798, the Senate confirmed Adams's nomination of Bushrod Washington, nephew of former President Washington, to succeed Associate Justice James Wilson. One year later, Alfred Moore succeeded Associate Justice James Iredell. Then, in January 1801, Adams named John Marshall as the Supreme Court's fourth Chief Justice, replacing Oliver Ellsworth, who had retired due to ill health. Adams had initially nominated former Chief Justice John Jay, but Jay declined to return to his former position. Marshall, who was serving as Secretary of State at the time, was quickly confirmed by the Senate, and took office on February 4. He continued to serve as Secretary of State until Adams' term expired on March 4.

== Foreign affairs ==
=== Relations with France ===
==== XYZ Affair ====
Adams's term was marked by disputes concerning the country's role in the expanding conflict in Europe, where Britain and France and their respective allies were at war. Hamilton and the Federalists supported Britain, while Jefferson and the Democratic-Republicans favored France. The intense battle over the Jay Treaty in 1795 had previously polarized politics throughout the nation and alienated the French. The Jay Treaty had resolved some of the major American complaints against the British, including the ongoing British impressment of American sailors, and President Washington viewed the treaty as the best method of avoiding another war with the British. The French were outraged by the Jay Treaty and began seizing American merchant ships that were trading with the British. In the 1796 elections, the French supported Jefferson for president, and they became even more belligerent at his loss. Nevertheless, when Adams took office, pro-French sentiment in the United States remained strong due to fear of Britain and memories of France's assistance during the Revolutionary War.

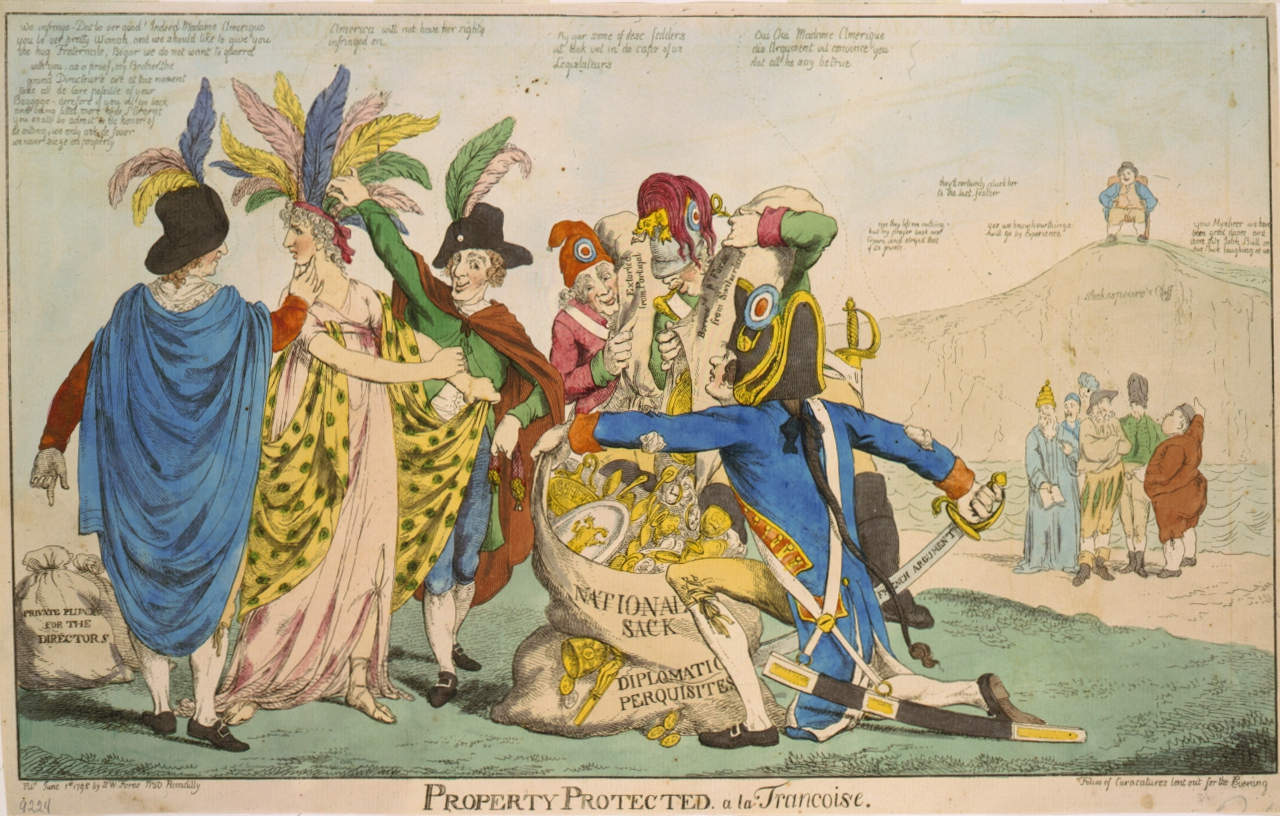
A political cartoon depicts the XYZ Affair – America is a woman being plundered by Frenchmen (1798).

Adams hoped to maintain friendly relations with France, and he sent a delegation to Paris, consisting of John Marshall, Charles Cotesworth Pinckney and Elbridge Gerry, to ask for compensation for the French attacks on American shipping. When the envoys arrived in October 1797, they were kept waiting for several days, and then finally granted only a 15-minute meeting with French Foreign Minister Talleyrand. After this, the diplomats were met by three of Talleyrand's agents. Each refused to conduct diplomatic negotiations unless the United States paid enormous bribes, one to Talleyrand personally, and another to the Republic of France. The Americans refused to negotiate on such terms. Marshall and Pinckney returned home, while Gerry remained.

In an April 1798 speech to Congress, Adams publicly revealed Talleyrand's machinations, sparking public outrage at the French. Democratic-Republicans were skeptical of the administration's account of what became known as the "XYZ affair." Many of Jefferson's supporters would undermine and oppose Adams's efforts to defend against the French. Their main fear was that war with France would lead to an alliance with England, which in turn could allow the allegedly monarchist Adams to further his domestic agenda. For their part, many Federalists, particularly the conservative "ultra-Federalists," deeply feared the radical influence of the French Revolution. Economics also drove the divide between Federalists and Democratic-Republicans, as Federalists sought financial ties with England, while many Democratic-Republicans feared the influence of English creditors.

==== Quasi-War ====
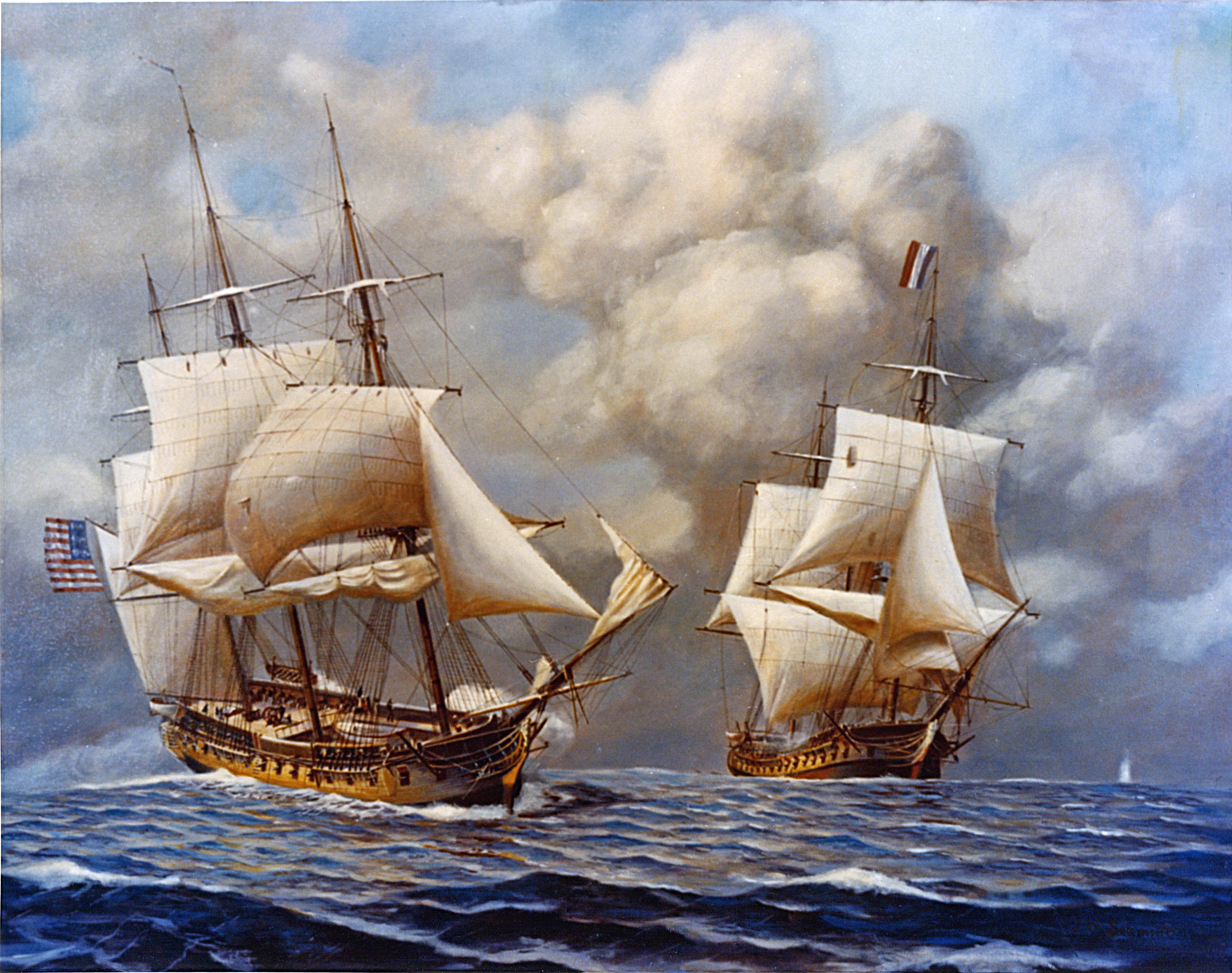
Scene depicting the February 9, 1799 engagement between the USS Constellation (left) and the L'Insurgente (right) during the Quasi-War

The president saw no advantage in joining the British-led alliance against France. He therefore pursued a strategy whereby American ships harassed French ships in an effort sufficient to stem the French assaults on American interests, beginning an undeclared naval war known as the Quasi-War. In light of the threat of invasion from the more powerful French forces, Adams asked Congress to authorize a major expansion of the navy and the creation of a twenty-five thousand man army. Congress authorized a ten-thousand man army and a moderate expansion of the navy, which at the time consisted of one unarmed custom boat. Washington was commissioned as senior officer of the army, and Adams reluctantly agreed to Washington's request that Hamilton serve as the army's second-in-command. It became apparent that Hamilton was truly in charge due to Washington's advanced years. The angered president remarked at the time, "Hamilton I know to be a proud Spirited, conceited, aspiring Mortal always pretending to Morality," he wrote, but "with as debauched Morals as old Franklin who is more his Model than anyone I know." Due to his support for the expansion of the navy and the creation of the United States Department of the Navy, Adams is "often called the father of the American Navy".

During the quasi-war, the navy achieved several victories, including the capture of L'Insurgente, a powerful French warship. The navy also opened trade relations with Saint-Domingue (now known as Haiti), a rebellious French colony in the Caribbean Sea. Over the opposition of many in his own party, Adams resisted the escalation of the war. The president's continued support for Elbridge Gerry, a Democratic-Republican who Adams had sent to France at the beginning of his term and who continued to seek peace with the French, particularly frustrated many Federalists. Hamilton's influence in the War Department also widened the rift between Federalist supporters of Adams and Hamilton. At the same time, the creation of a large standing army raised popular alarm and played into the hands of the Democratic-Republicans.

In February 1799, Adams surprised many by announcing that he would send diplomat William Vans Murray on a peace mission to France. Adams delayed sending a delegation while he awaited the construction of several U.S. warships, which he hoped would alter the balance of power in the Caribbean. Much to the chagrin of Hamilton and other arch-Federalists, the delegation was finally dispatched in November 1799. The president's decision to send a second delegation to France precipitated a bitter split in the Federalist Party, and some Federalist leaders began to look for an alternative to Adams in the 1800 presidential election. The prospects for peace between the U.S. and France were bolstered by the ascent of Napoleon in November 1799, as he viewed the Quasi-War as a distraction from the ongoing war in Europe. In the spring of 1800, the delegation sent by Adams began negotiating with the French delegation, led by Joseph Bonaparte.

The war came to a close in September when both parties signed the Convention of 1800, but the French refused to recognize the abdication of the Treaty of Alliance of 1778, which had created a Franco-American alliance. The United States gained little from the settlement other than the suspension of hostilities with the French, but the timing of the agreement proved fortunate for the U.S., as the French would gain a temporary reprieve from war with Britain in the 1802 Treaty of Amiens. News of the signing of the convention did not arrive in the United States until after the election. Overcoming the opposition of some Federalists, Adams was able to win Senate ratification of the convention in February 1801. Having concluded the war, Adams demobilized the emergency army.

=== Relations with Spain ===
The U.S. and Spain had signed the Treaty of San Lorenzo in 1795, which set border with the Spanish territory of Louisiana. Yet with war between France and the United States looming, Spain was slow to implement the terms of the treaty, which included the Spanish cession of the Yazoo lands and the disarmament of Spanish forts along the Mississippi River. Shortly after Adams took office, Senator William Blount's plans to drive the Spanish out of Louisiana and Florida became public, causing a deterioration in relations between the U.S. and Spain. Francisco de Miranda, a Venezuelan patriot, also attempted to stir up support for an American intervention against Spain, possibly with the help of the British. Rejecting Hamilton's ambitions for the seizure of Spanish territory, Adams refused to meet with Miranda, squashing the plot. Having avoided war with both France and Spain, the Adams administration oversaw the implementation of the Treaty of San Lorenzo.

== Domestic affairs ==
=== Move to Washington DC ===
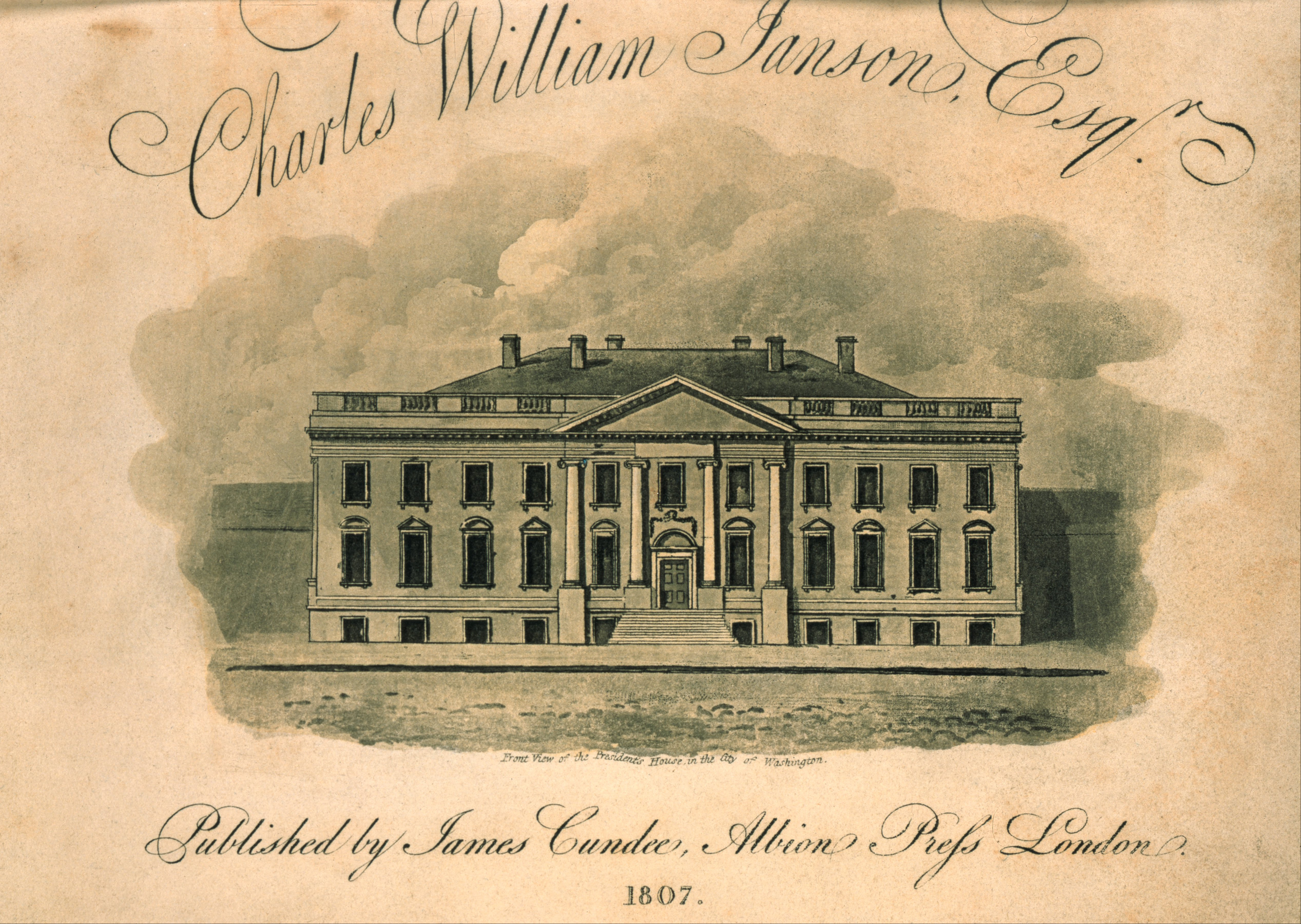
President's House (north front), Washington

In 1790, Congress, through the Residence Act, had set the site for a permanent national capital along the Potomac River. December 1800 was set as the deadline for completion of government buildings in the new capital. The nascent city was named after President Washington, and the federal district surrounding it was named Columbia, which was a poetic name for the United States commonly in use at that time. The Act also moved the temporary capital from New York City to Philadelphia as of 1791.

Congress adjourned its last meeting in Philadelphia on May 15, 1800, and the city officially ceased to be the nation's seat of government as of June 11. In June 1800, Adams made his first official visit to Washington; amid the "raw and unfinished" cityscape, the president found the public buildings "in a much greater forwardness of completion than expected." The north (Senate) wing of the Capitol was nearly completed, as was the White House. The president moved into the White House on November 1, and First Lady Abigail Adams arrived a few weeks later. Upon arriving, Adams wrote to her, "Before I end my letter, I pray Heaven to bestow the best of Blessings on this House and all that shall hereafter inhabit it. May none but honest and wise Men ever rule under this roof."

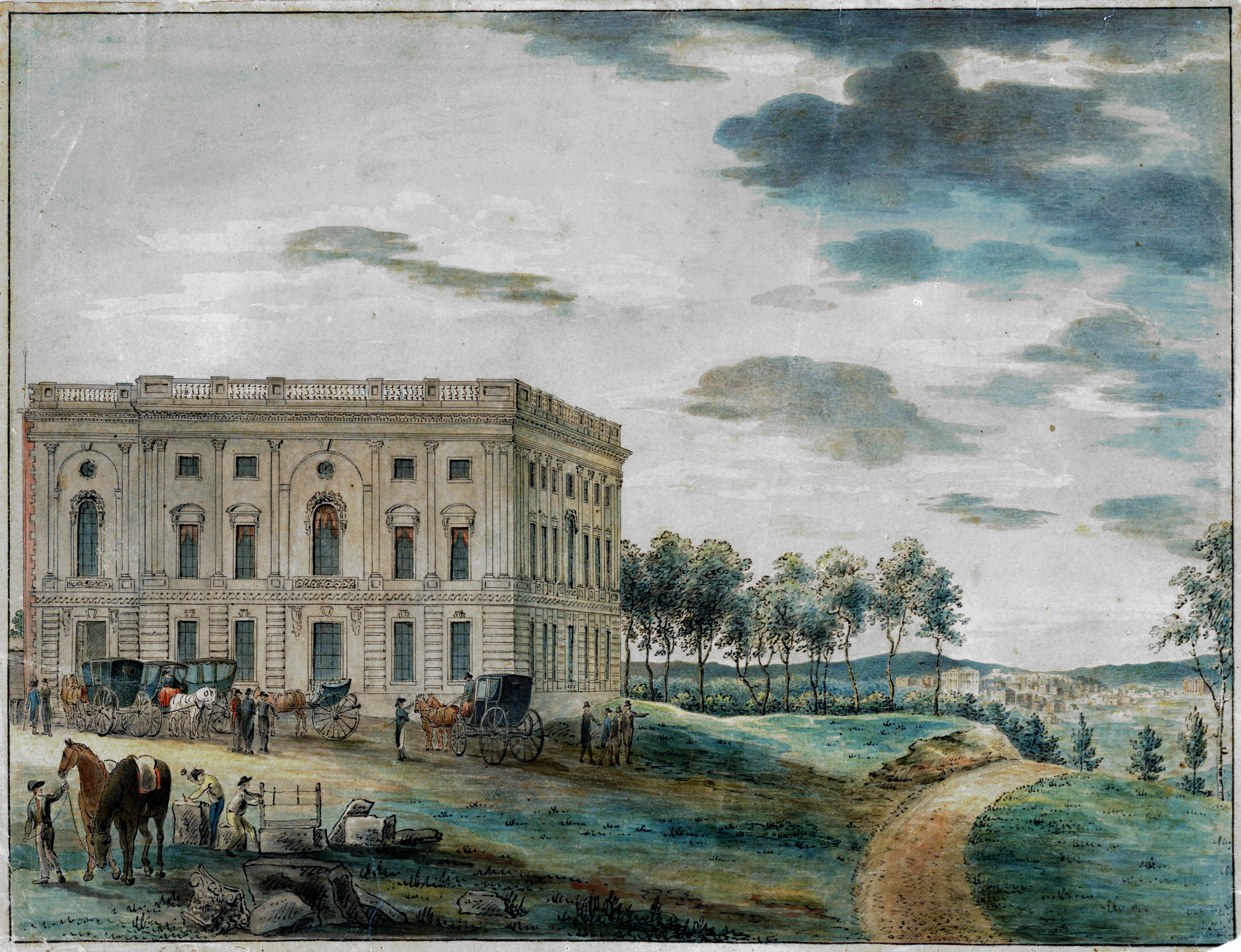
Congress House (east front), Washington

The Senate of the 6th Congress met for the first time in the Capitol building on November 17, 1800. On November 22, Adams delivered his fourth State of the Union Address to a joint session of Congress in the Senate chamber. He began his speech by congratulating members on their new seat of government and—pointedly—"on the prospect of a residence not to be changed." He added, optimistically, "Although there is some cause to apprehend that accommodations are not now so complete as might be wished, yet there is great reason to believe that this inconvenience will cease with the present session." This would be the last annual message any president would personally deliver to Congress for the next 113 years. The following February, Congress approved the District of Columbia Organic Act of 1801, which officially organized the District of Columbia. In accordance with the Constitution, Congress became the district's governing authority.

=== Alien and Sedition Acts ===
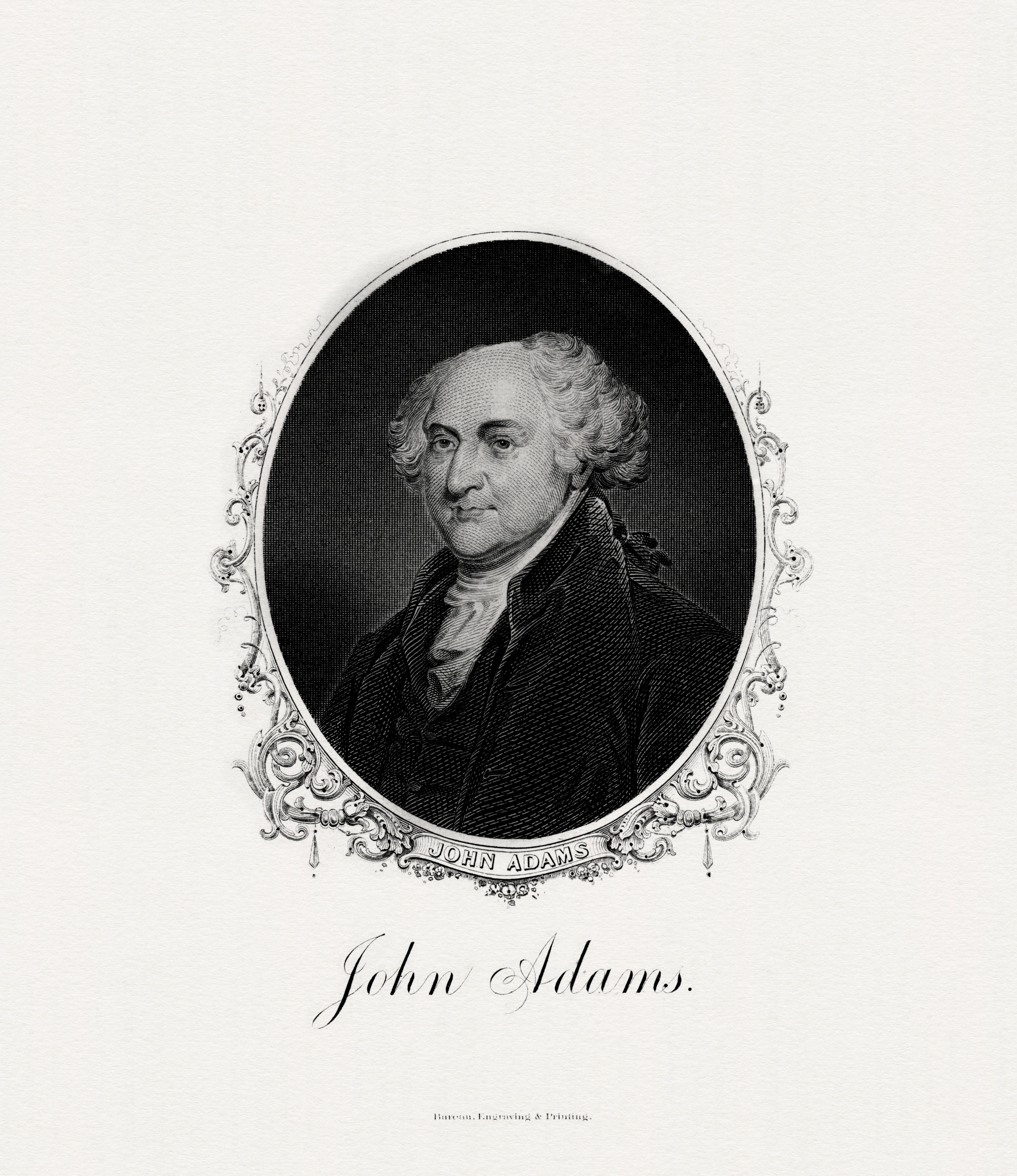
BEP engraved portrait of Adams as President

The U.S. became increasingly polarized by the Quasi-War, and Adams faced bitter attacks in the press. Many recent immigrants, including those from Ireland, looked favorably on the French and opposed the British. One Irish-American congressman, Matthew Lyon, engaged in a fist fight with a Federalist congressman. In an attempt to quell the threat of subversion among hostile immigrants, the Federalists passed a series of laws, the "Alien and Sedition Acts" in 1798. Historians debate Adams' involvement beyond his signature; he denied seeking the acts in his memoirs, but his complaints about "libelous" attacks on his presidency may have played a role in the laws' passage.

The Alien and Sedition Acts consisted of four measures – the Naturalization Act, the Alien Friends Act, the Alien Enemies Act, and the Sedition Act. These statutes were designed to mitigate the threat of secessionists by disallowing their most extreme firebrands. The Naturalization Act increased to 14 years the period of residence required for an immigrant to attain American citizenship. The Alien Friends Act and the Alien Enemies Act allowed the president to deport any foreigner whom he considered dangerous to the country. The Sedition Act made it a crime to publish "false, scandalous, and malicious writing" against the government or its officials. Punishments included 2–5 years in prison and fines of up to $5,000.

The acts became controversial due to the prosecution of a congressman and a number of newspaper editors. The Federalist administration initiated fourteen or more indictments under the Sedition Act, as well as suits against five of the six most prominent Democratic-Republican newspapers. According to biographer Ferling, the majority of the legal actions began in 1798 and 1799, and went to trial on the eve of the 1800 presidential election; the timing hardly appeared coincidental. Other historians have cited evidence that the Alien and Sedition Acts were rarely enforced: only 10 convictions under the Sedition Act have been identified; Adams never signed a deportation order; and the sources of expressed furor over the acts were Democratic-Republicans. However, other historians have emphasized that the acts were used for political targeting from the outset, causing many aliens to leave the country. The acts also allowed for the prosecution of many who opposed the Federalists, even on the floor of Congress.

Rejecting the constitutionality of the acts, Jefferson and Madison secretly wrote the Kentucky and Virginia Resolutions, in which the governments of Kentucky and Virginia purportedly nullified the acts. As debate over the acts continued, the election of 1800 became a bitter and volatile contest, with each side expressing extraordinary fear of the other and its policies. After Democratic-Republicans prevailed in the elections of 1800, they used the acts against Federalists before the laws finally expired.

=== Taxation and Fries's Rebellion ===
To pay for the military buildup of the Quasi-War, Adams and the Federalists in Congress enacted the Direct Tax of 1798. Direct taxation by the federal government was widely unpopular, and the government's revenue under Washington had mostly come from excise taxes and tariffs. Though Washington had maintained a balanced budget with the help of a growing economy, increased military expenditures now threatened to cause major budget deficits. Hamilton, Alcott, and Adams developed a taxation plan to meet the need for increased government revenue. The Direct Tax of 1798 instituted a progressive land value tax of up to 1% of the value of a property. Taxpayers in eastern Pennsylvania resisted federal tax collectors, and in March 1799 the bloodless Fries's Rebellion broke out. Led by Revolutionary War veteran John Fries, rural German-speaking farmers protested what they saw as a threat to their republican liberties and to their churches. The tax revolt raised the specter of class warfare, and Hamilton led the army into the area to put down the revolt. The subsequent trial of Fries gained wide national attention. Adams pardoned Fries and two others after they were sentenced to be executed for treason. The rebellion, the deployment of the army, and the results of the trials alienated many in Pennsylvania and other states from the Federalist Party, damaging Adams's re-election hopes.

=== Midnight judges ===
From early in his presidency, Adams had advocated for the creation of new federal judgeships, but had been rebuffed by Congress. After the Federalists lost control of both houses of Congress and the presidency in the election of 1800, many previously opposed Federalists came to support the proposal, as the expansion of the courts would allow for the appointment of numerous Federalists to life-tenured government positions. The lame-duck session of the 6th Congress approved the Judiciary Act of 1801, which created a set of federal appeals courts between the district courts and the Supreme Court. It also reduced the size of the Supreme Court from six justices to five, to take effect upon the next vacancy. This was done to deny Jefferson an opportunity to appoint a justice until two vacancies occurred. As Adams filled these new positions during the final days of his presidency, opposition newspapers and politicians soon began referring to the appointees as "midnight judges." Most of these judges lost their posts when the Democratic-Republican-dominated 7th Congress approved the Judiciary Act of 1802, abolishing the newly created courts, and returning the federal court system to its earlier structure.

After being swept out of power in 1800 by Jefferson and the Democratic-Republican Party, the Federalists focused their hopes for the survival of the republic on the federal judiciary. During Marshall's 34 years as chief justice, the Marshall Court played a major role in increasing the federal government's power and in establishing the judiciary as a co-equal branch of the federal government alongside the executive and legislative branches. Later, Adams reflected, "My gift of John Marshall to the people of the United States was the proudest act of my life."

=== Other domestic issues ===
Throughout his entire life, Adams disliked slavery and refused to own any slaves. In 1800, the Slave Trade Act of 1800 restricted the international trade in slaves and Adams signed it into law on May 10, 1800.

George Logan was a Senator who secretly negotiated with France in 1798. Many were outraged that an average citizen went to Paris to negotiate with a foreign power and so they passed the Logan Act in response. John Adams signed the bill. The intent behind the Act is to prevent unauthorized negotiations from undermining the government's position.

== Election of 1800 ==
With the Federalist Party deeply split over his negotiations with France, and the opposition Democratic-Republicans enraged over the Alien and Sedition Acts and the expansion of the military, Adams faced a daunting reelection campaign. Even so, his position within the party was strong, bolstered by his enduring popularity in New England, the main Federalist base. In early 1800, Federalist members of Congress nominated Adams and Charles C. Pinckney for the presidency; the caucus did not explicitly indicate which individual was favored for the presidency or the vice presidency. The Democratic-Republicans, meanwhile, nominated Jefferson and Burr, their candidates in the previous election, but designated Jefferson as the party's first choice.

1800 presidential election electoral vote results (showing votes only for Jefferson or Adams)

The campaign was bitter and marked by malicious insults from both sides' partisan press. The Federalists claimed that the Republicans were radicals who would ruin the country through revolution. Republicans were the enemies of "all who love order, peace, virtue, and religion." They were said to be libertines and dangerous radicals who favored states' rights over the Union and would instigate anarchy and civil war. Jefferson's rumored affairs with slaves were used against him. Republicans, for their part, accused federalists of undermining republican principles through punitive federal laws, as well as of favoring Britain and the other coalition countries in their war with France in order to promote aristocratic, anti-republican values. Jefferson was portrayed as an apostle of liberty and man of the people, while Adams was labelled a monarchist. He was accused of insanity and marital infidelity. James T. Callender, a Republican propagandist secretly financed by Jefferson, launched strong attacks on Adams's character and accused him of attempting to make war with France. Callender was arrested and jailed under the Sedition Act, which only further inflamed Republican passions.

At times, opposition from the Federalist Party was equally intense. Some, including Pickering, accused Adams of colluding with Jefferson so that he would end up either president or vice president. Hamilton was hard at work, attempting to sabotage the President's reelection. In planning an indictment of Adams' character, he requested and received private documents from both the ousted cabinet secretaries and Wolcott. The letter was initially intended for only a few Federalist electors. Upon seeing a draft, several Federalists urged Hamilton not to send it. Wolcott wrote that "the poor old man" could do himself in without their help. But Hamilton did not heed their advice. On October 24, he sent a pamphlet strongly attacking Adams on a number of points. Hamilton denounced many of Adams's policy decisions, including the "precipitate nomination" of Murray, the pardoning of Fries, and the firing of Pickering. He also included a fair share of personal insults, vilifying the President's "disgusting egotism" and "ungovernable temper". Adams, he concluded, was "emotionally unstable, given to impulsive and irrational decisions, unable to coexist with his closest advisers, and generally unfit to be president." Strangely, it ended by saying that the electors should support Adams and Pinckney equally. Thanks to Burr, who had covertly obtained a copy, the pamphlet became public knowledge and was distributed throughout the country by Republicans, who rejoiced in what it contained. The pamphlet destroyed the Federalist Party, ended Hamilton's political career, and helped ensure Adams's already-likely defeat.

1800 electoral vote totals
Name	Party	Votes
Thomas Jefferson	Democratic-Republican	73
Aaron Burr	Democratic-Republican	73
John Adams	Federalist	65
C. C. Pinckney	Federalist	64
John Jay	Federalist	1

When the electoral votes were counted, Adams finished in third place with 65 votes, and Pinckney came in fourth with 64 votes (one New England Federalist elector voted for John Jay instead). Jefferson and Burr tied for first place with 73 votes each. Because of the tie, the election devolved upon the House of Representatives. As specified by the Constitution, each state's delegation voted en bloc, with each state having a single vote; an absolute majority (nine, as there were 16 states at the time) was required for victory. On February 17, 1801 – on the 36th ballot – Jefferson was elected by a vote of 10 to 4 (two states abstained). It is noteworthy that Hamilton's scheme, although it made the Federalists appear divided and therefore helped Jefferson win, failed in its overall attempt to woo Federalist electors away from Adams.

Ferling attributes Adams's defeat to five factors: the stronger organization of the Republicans; Federalist disunity; the controversy surrounding the Alien and Sedition Acts; the popularity of Jefferson in the South; and the effective politicking of Aaron Burr in New York. Analyzing the causes of the party's trouncing, Adams wrote, "No party that ever existed knew itself so little or so vainly overrated its own influence and popularity as ours. None ever understood so ill the causes of its own power, or so wantonly destroyed them." Stephen G. Kurtz argues that Hamilton and his supporters were primarily responsible for the destruction of the Federalist Party. They viewed the party as a personal tool and played into the hands of the Jeffersonians by building up a large standing army and creating a feud with Adams. Chernow writes that Hamilton believed that by eliminating Adams, he could eventually pick up the pieces of the ruined Federalist Party and lead it back to dominance. "Better to purge Adams and let Jefferson govern for a while than to water down the party's ideological purity with compromises," Chernow says.

To compound the agony of his defeat, Adams's son Charles, a long-time alcoholic, died on November 30. Anxious to rejoin Abigail, who had already left for Massachusetts, Adams departed the White House in the predawn hours of March 4, 1801, and did not attend Jefferson's inauguration. Since him, three other outgoing presidents of the United States have not attended the inaugurations of their successors. Adams wrote that he had left the next president a nation "with its coffers full" and "fair prospects of peace". The transfer of presidential power between Adams and Jefferson represented the first such transfer between two different political parties in U.S. history, and set the precedent for all subsequent inter-party transitions. The complications arising out of the 1796 and 1800 elections prompted Congress and the states to refine the process whereby the Electoral College elects a president and a vice president. The new procedure was enacted through the 12th Amendment, which became a part of the Constitution in June 1804 and first took effect in the 1804 presidential election.

== Historical reputation ==
Historian Stephen Kurtz has argued:

In 1796 Adams stood at the pinnacle of his career. Contemporaries as well as historians ever since have judged him a man of wisdom, honesty, and devotion to the national interest; at the same time, his suspicions and theories led him to fall short of attaining that full measure of greatness for which he longed and labored.... As the nation entered the severe crisis with revolutionary France, and in his attempt to steer the state between humiliating concessions and a potentially disastrous war [he] played a lone hand which left him isolated from increasingly bewildered and better Federalist leaders. His decision to renew peace negotiations after the XYZ Affair, the buildup of armaments, the passage of the Alien and Sedition Acts, and the appointment of Hamilton to command of the army came like an explosion in February 1799. While a majority of Americans were relieved and sympathetic, the Federalist party lay shattered in 1800 on the eve of its decisive conflict with Jeffersonian Republicanism.

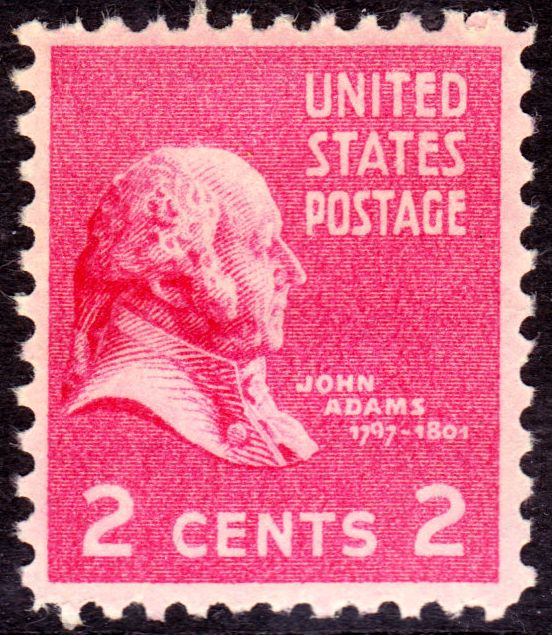
John Adams, 2-cent U.S. postage stamp, 1938 Presidential Series

Polls of historians and political scientists rank Adams toward the top of the middle third of presidents. Historian George Herring argues that Adams was the most independent-minded of the founders. Though he aligned with the Federalists, he was somewhat a party unto himself, disagreeing with the Federalists as much as he did the Jeffersonian Republicans. He was often described as "prickly", but his tenacity was fed by good decisions made in the face of universal opposition. Adams was often combative, which diminished presidential decorum, as Adams himself admitted in his old age: "[As president] I refused to suffer in silence. I sighed, sobbed, and groaned, and sometimes screeched and screamed. And I must confess to my shame and sorrow that I sometimes swore." Adams' resolve to advance peace with France, rather than to continue hostilities, especially reduced his popularity. This played an important role in his reelection defeat, however he was so pleased with the outcome that he had it engraved on his tombstone. Historian Ralph Adams Brown argues that, by keeping the United States out of war with France, Adams allowed the fledgling nation to grow and prosper into the transcontinental nation it eventually became in the 19th century.

Polls of historians and political scientists have generally ranked Adams as an average or above-average president, and one of the best who served a single term. In a 2017 C-SPAN survey, 91 presidential historians ranked Adams 19th among the 43 former presidents, (down from 17th in 2009). His rankings in the various categories of this most recent poll were as follows: public persuasion (22), crisis leadership (17), economic management (15), moral authority (11), international relations (13), administrative skills (21), relations with congress (24), vision/setting an agenda (20), pursued equal justice for all (15), performance with context of times (19). A 2024 poll of the American Political Science Association’s Presidents and Executive Politics section ranked Adams as the thirteenth best president.

== See also ==
- Diplomacy of John Adams
- Federalist Era

== Works cited ==
- Allen, William C. (2001). History of the United States Capitol: A Chronicle of Design, Construction, and Politics. S. Doc. 106-29. Government Printing Office. ISBN 0-16-050830-4. Archived from the original on December 16, 2008.
- Brown, Ralph A. (1975). The Presidency of John Adams. American Presidency Series. Lawrence, Kansas: University Press of Kansas. ISBN 0-7006-0134-1.
- Chernow, Ron (2004). Alexander Hamilton. Penguin Books. ISBN 1-59420-009-2.
- Crew, Harvey W.; Webb, William Bensing; Wooldridge, John, eds. (1892). Centennial History of the City of Washington, D. C.: With Full Outline of the Natural Advantages, Accounts of the Indian Tribes, Selection of the Site, Founding of the City ... to the Present Time. Dayton, Ohio: United Brethern Publishing House.
- Diggins, John P. (2003). Schlesinger, Arthur M. (ed.). John Adams. The American Presidents. New York, New York: Time Books. ISBN 0-8050-6937-2.
- Elkins, Stanley M.; McKitrick, Eric (1993). The Age of Federalism. Oxford University Press. ISBN 0195068904.
- Ellis, Joseph J. (1993). Passionate Sage: The Character and Legacy of John Adams. W. W. Norton & Company. ISBN 0393311333.
- Ferling, John (1992). John Adams: A Life. Knoxville: University of Tennessee Press. ISBN 0-87049-730-8. online book review
- Ferling, John (2004). Adams vs. Jefferson: The Tumultuous Election of 1800. New York: Oxford University Press. ISBN 0-19-516771-6.; online book review
- Herring, George C. (2008). From colony to superpower: U.S. foreign relations since 1776. Oxford University Press. ISBN 978-0199743773.
- Hoadley, John F. (1986). Origins of American Political Parties: 1789–1803. Lexington, Kentucky: University Press of Kentucky. ISBN 978-0-8131-5320-9.
- Kurtz, Stephen G. (1957). The Presidency of John Adams: The Collapse of Federalism, 1795–1800. Philadelphia: University of Pennsylvania Press.
- McCullough, David (2001). John Adams. Simon & Schuster. p. 144. ISBN 978-1-4165-7588-7.
- McDonald, Forrest (1974). The Presidency of George Washington. American Presidency. University Press of Kansas. ISBN 978-0-7006-0359-6.
- Miller, John C. (1960). The Federalist Era: 1789–1801. New York, Harper.
- Morison, Samuel Eliot (1965). The Oxford History of the American People. New York: Oxford University Press. LCCN 65-12468.
- Morse, John Torey (1884). John Adams. Boston, MA: Houghton, Mifflin, and Company. OCLC 926779205.
- Pasley, Jeffrey L. (2013). The First Presidential Contest: 1796 and the Founding of American Democracy. Lawrence, Kansas: The University Press of Kansas. ISBN 978-0-7006-1907-8.
- Smith, Page (1962). John Adams. Vol. II 1784–1826. New York: Doubleday. LCCN 63-7188.; online book review
- Watkins, William J. Jr. (2004). Reclaiming the American Revolution: The Kentucky and Virginia Resolutions and their Legacy. New York, New York: Palgrave Macmillan. p. 28. ISBN 1-4039-6303-7.
- Wood, Gordon S. (2009). Empire of Liberty: A history of the Early Republic, 1789–1815. New York: Oxford University Press. ISBN 978-0199741090.
