= BFPP =

BFPP may refer to:

- Bilateral frontoparietal polymicrogyria, genetic disease
- GPR56, GPCR
- Bulletin Français de la Pêche et de la Pisciculture
