= KMAE =

KMAE may refer to:

- KMAE (FM), a radio station (90.1 FM) licensed to serve Maeser, Utah, United States
- KRVA (AM), a radio station (1600 AM) licensed to serve Cockrell Hill, Texas, United States, which held the call sign KMAE from 1947 to 1965
- Madera Municipal Airport, an airport serving Madera, California assigned the ICAO code KMAE
- Knowledge and Management of Aquatic Ecosystems, a peer-reviewed open access scientific journal
