= Nuovo Cimento =

Series of scientific physics journals

- Discipline: Physics
- Language: English

Standard abbreviations
- ISO 4: Nuovo Cimento

Nuovo Cimento is a series of peer-reviewed scientific journals of physics. The series was first established in 1855, when Carlo Matteucci and Raffaele Piria started publishing Il Nuovo Cimento as the continuation of Il Cimento, which they established in 1844. In 1897, it became the official journal of the Italian Physical Society.

== Sub-journals ==
Over time, the journal split into several sub-journals:

- Nuovo Cimento A (1965–1999): Focused on particle physics. The journal ended when it was merged into the European Physical Journal, in 1999.
- Nuovo Cimento B (1965–2010): Focused on relativity, astronomy, and mathematical physics. As of 1 January 2011 it continues publication as the European Physical Journal Plus.
- Nuovo Cimento C (1978–present): Focuses on geophysics, astrophysics, and biophysics.
- Nuovo Cimento D (1982–1998): Focuses on solid state physics, atomic physics, and molecular biology. The journal ended when it was merged into the European Physical Journal in 1998.
- Supplemento al Nuovo Cimento (1949–1968): A supplement to Nuovo Cimento
- Lettere al Nuovo Cimento (1969–1986): A series for letters and other short publications. The journal ended when it was merged into Europhysics Letters in 1986.
- Rivista del Nuovo Cimento (1969–present): Publishes review articles.

== See also ==
- Accademia del Cimento
