= Luisa Cifarelli =

Italian physicist

- Education: University of Bologna
- Scientific career
- Workplaces: University of Bologna; University of Salerno; University of Pisa

Luisa Cifarelli FInstP (born 11 June 1952) is a Professor of Experimental Particle Physics at the University of Bologna. She is the Director of the La Rivista del Nuovo Cimento.

== Early life and education ==
Cifarelli was born in Rome in 1952, daughter of Michele Cifarelli, an Italian politician and magistrate. She studied physics at the University of Bologna and graduated in 1975. She worked as a researcher in at the Istituto Nazionale di Fisica Nucleare and CERN. She edited the collection of scientific studies for the publication QCD at 200 TeV. In 1988 she was made an associate professor at L'Università degli Studi di Napoli Federico II.

== Career ==
Cifarelli was appointed full Professor at the University of Pisa in 1991. She moved to the University of Salerno in 1993. She works at CERN, the Laboratori Nazionali del Gran Sasso, DESY and the Istituto Nazionale di Fisica Nucleare. She has been involved in the design and construction of the ALICE experiment, which studies proton-proton and nucleus-nucleus collisions at extreme energies. She was made Head of the ALICE Data Analysis and Simulation Group in 2000. She served as Deputy Chairperson of the time of flight experiment at ALICE. She used the ALICE experiment to study quark-gluon interactions. She coordinates the Extreme Energy Events experiments, which uses muon detectors in high schools around Italy to study cosmic swarms. She serves on the DarkSide project; a 20 tonne Two-Phase LAr TPC for Direct Dark Matter Detection at the Laboratori Nazionali del Gran Sasso.

In 2008, Cifarelli was the first woman to be made President of the Italian Physical Society in 2008. That year she was also elected as a Fellow of the Institute of Physics. In 2011 she was appointed President of the European Physical Society. Cifarelli was the first woman to be elected president of the European Physical Society. She was made President of the Enrico Fermi Center for Study and Research. She has spoken about the life of Enrico Fermi extensively. Cifarelli has acted as editor of the European Physical Journal. She serves on the editorial board of Elsevier's Nuclear Instruments and Methods in Physics Research.
