= PhysMath Central =

Springer Science+Business Media imprint

- Parent company: Springer Science+Business Media
- Status: Defunct (2011)
- Founded: 2007
- Distribution: Open access
- Publication types: Scientific journals
- Nonfiction topics: Physics, Mathematics
- Official website: www.physmathcentral.com

PhysMath Central was an imprint of Springer Science+Business Media, publishing online open-access scientific journals in physics and mathematics and operated by BioMed Central. It was active from 2007 until 2011.

Journals published were:

- PMC Physics A
- PMC Physics B
- PMC Biophysics

PMC Physics A and B were discontinued in 2011 in favor of EPJ Open, the open-access component of the European Physical Journal. PMC Biophysics was relaunched as BMC Biophysics within the BioMed Central journal family.
