= European Physical Journal H =

- Discipline: History of physics
- Language: English
- Edited by: Michael Eckert and James D. Wells

Publication details
- Former name: Annales de Physique
- History: 1976–present
- Publisher: Springer Science+Business Media
- Frequency: Quarterly
- Impact factor: 0.828 (2020)

Standard abbreviations
- ISO 4: Eur. Phys. J. H

Indexing
- ISSN: 2102-6459 (print); 2102-6467 (web)
- OCLC no.: 438125684

Links
- Journal homepage; Online archive; Annales de Physique

The European Physical Journal H: Historical Perspectives on Contemporary Physics (EPJ H) is a quarterly peer-reviewed academic journal which focuses on the history of modern physics. It is the newest journal from the European Physical Journal series. It was first founded in the 18th century as Annales de chimie et de physique, later on re-established in 1976 as the Annales de Physique. It obtained its current title in July 2010.

EPJ H is published by Springer Science+Business Media and the editors-in-chief are Michael Eckert (Deutsches Museum München) and James D. Wells (University of Michigan).

== Abstracting and indexing ==
The journal is indexed and abstracted in Chemical Abstracts Service, Science Citation Index Expanded, Scopus, Astrophysics Data System, Academic OneFile, and Current Contents/Physical, Chemical and Earth Sciences. According to the Journal Citation Reports, the journal has a 2016 impact factor of 0.436.
