= Georges Henri Victor Collot =

French military officer

Victor Collot
- Born: Georges Henri Victor Collot; March 21, 1750; Châlons-sur-Marne
- Died: May 15, 1805 (aged 55); Paris

Georges Henri Victor Collot (English: /kɒˈloʊ/ ko-LOH, French: [ʒɔʁʒ ɑ̃ʁi viktɔʁ kɔlo]; 21 March 1750 – 15 May 1805) was a French military officer who served as the governor of Guadeloupe before surrendering the island to the British in 1794. In 1796, he was sent on a reconnaissance mission to the American frontier and Spanish Louisiana by Pierre Adet.

== Career ==
During the American Revolutionary War Victor worked under Jean-Baptiste Donatien de Vimeur, comte de Rochambeau.

=== Governor ===
On 20 April 1793, hundreds of slaves rose up in rebellion and killed 22 white people on plantations. These slaves surrendered themselves to soldiers the same day and stated that they fought in the name of the French First Republic and that their masters were involved in an anti-French plot. Collot was shocked that local officials were sympathetic to the rebels and believed that they stopped a plot by the British and planters; the planters of Martinique rose up in rebellion to aid the British invasion in 1793. Collot had the rebels disarmed and wanted to imprison them, but the Committee on General Security rejected this.

Collot wanted to raise four battalions to defend the island and proposed using property concessions in return for enlistment, but neither of these proposals were accepted by the commission. When Collot learned of the British attack on Martinique he declared that Guadeloupe was under a state of siege. Only 611 French soldiers were present to defend Guadeloupe while the British had over 4,000 soldiers. The British landed on Guadeloupe on 11 April 1794, and Collot surrendered Guadeloupe to the British. The British sent Collot to Philadelphia. Victor Hugues retook Guadeloupe for the French six weeks after Collot's surrender.

=== Espionage ===
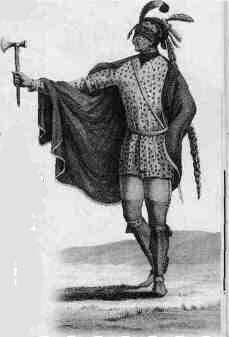
Illinois Indian of the Kaskaskia Tribe, engraving based on drawing by General Georges-Henri-Victor Collot, 1796

Pierre Adet, the French ambassador to the United States, selected Collot to do a reconnaissance mission on the geography of the American frontier and Spanish Louisiana. Collot openly spoke about having the western United States leave and form its own country under French protection. News of Collot's action reached Secretary of Treasury Oliver Wolcott Jr. and he informed President George Washington and his cabinet. Secretary of War James McHenry sent a letter to Northwest Territory Governor Arthur St. Clair to arrest Collot, but by the time the letter arrived Collot was beyond the territory of St. Clair.

During Collot's travels he met with the Kaskaskia. Collot was followed and arrested by Zebulon Pike at Fort Massac, but could not detain him. Spanish authorities followed Collot after his release. A military guard sent by Francisco Luis Héctor de Carondelet arrested Collot on 27 October 1796, while he was at a sugar plantation near New Orleans. He was deported, but allowed him to keep his maps and journals and returned to Philadelphia in February 1797.

Napoleon acquired Louisiana from Spain in 1800, and appointed Adet and Collot as officials in Louisiana.

The maps from Collot's 1796 expedition were printed in Paris in 1804, but were not published to prevent French espionage from being revealed. These maps were not published until 1826.

== Legacy ==
In 2017, the Kentucky Gateway Museum Center purchased two original prints of maps made by Collot.

== Works cited ==
=== Books ===
- Cormack, William (2019). Patriots, Royalists, and Terrorists in the West Indies: The French Revolution in Martinique and Guadeloupe, 1789-1802. University of Toronto Press. ISBN 9781487519148.
- DuBois, Laurent (2004). A Colony of Citizens: Revolution and Slave Emancipation in the French Caribbean, 1787-1804. University of North Carolina Press. ISBN 0807855367.
- Morrissey, Robert (2015). Empire by Collaboration: Indians, Colonists, and Governments in Colonial Illinois Country. University of Pennsylvania Press. ISBN 9780812291117.
- Narrett, David (2015). Adventurism and Empire: The Struggle for Mastery in the Louisiana-Florida Borderlands, 1762-1803. University of North Carolina Press. ISBN 9781469618357.
- Nester, William (2012). The Hamiltonian Vision, 1789-1800: The Art of American Power During the Early Republic. University of Nebraska Press. ISBN 9781597976756.
- Tsien, Jennifer (2023). Rumors of Revolution: Song, Sentiment, and Sedition in Colonial Louisiana. University of Virginia Press. ISBN 9780813949628.

=== Journals ===
- Conlin, Michael (2000). "The American Mission of Citizen Pierre-Auguste Adet: Revolutionary Chemistry and Diplomacy in the Early Republic". Pennsylvania Magazine of History and Biography. 124 (4). University of Pennsylvania Press: 489–520. doi:10.2307/20093399. JSTOR 20093399.

=== News ===
- Eblen, Tom (19 March 2017). "Kentucky invasion? Rare spy map shows French plans for frontier America". Lexington Herald-Leader. Archived from the original on 2 October 2019.
