= European Physical Journal B =

- Discipline: Condensed matter physics and complex systems
- Language: English
- Edited by: Eduardo Hernandez, Heiko Rieger, Bikas Chakrabarti, Wenhui Duan

Publication details
- Former name(s): Zeitschrift für Physik B
- History: 1998–present
- Publisher: EDP Sciences, Società Italiana di Fisica, and Springer Science+Business Media
- Frequency: Monthly
- Impact factor: 1.6 (2022)

Standard abbreviations
- ISO 4: Eur. Phys. J. B

Indexing
- CODEN: EPJBFY
- ISSN: 1434-6028 (print); 1434-6036 (web)
- OCLC no.: 633742901

Links
- Journal homepage; Online archive

The European Physical Journal B: Condensed Matter and Complex Systems is a peer-reviewed scientific journal that covers condensed matter physics, statistical and nonlinear physics, and complex systems. Part of the European Physical Journal series, it is jointly published by EDP Sciences, the Società Italiana di Fisica, and Springer Science+Business Media.

== Abstracting and indexing ==
The European Physical Journal B is indexed in the following databases:

- Science Citation Index
- Journal Citation Reports
- Materials Science Citation Index
- Chemical Abstracts Service
- CSA - ProQuest
- Zentralblatt Math

== See also ==
- European Physical Journal
