= Pierre Adet =

French scientist, politician, and diplomat

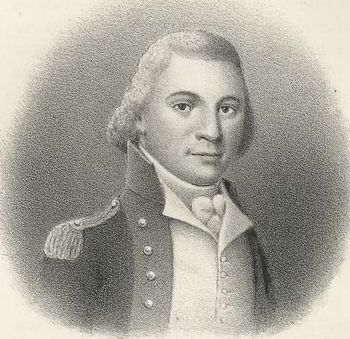
- Pierre Auguste Adet
- Born: 17 May 1763; Nevers, France
- Died: 19 March 1834 (aged 70); Paris, France

Pierre-Auguste, chevalier Adet (French: [pjɛʁ adɛ]; 17 May 1763 – 19 March 1834) was a French scientist, politician, and diplomat. He worked with Lavoisier on a new chemical notation system, and was secretary to the scientific periodical Annales de chimie, founded in 1789.

He proved that glacial acetic acid and vinegar acetic acid were the same substance.

In 1796, Adet was elected a member of the American Philosophical Society. He was secretary to the Minister of the Navy and the Colonies, Jean Dalbarade. He was commissioner to Saint-Domingue. He later became French ambassador to the United States, He sent Victor Collot on a reconnaissance of the Ohio River, and Mississippi River. In 1803, he was Prefect of the Nièvre département. In 1809, he was a member of the Corps législatif.

== 1796 presidential election ==
As French minister (ambassador) to the United States, Adet openly supported the Democratic-Republican Party and its presidential nominee, Thomas Jefferson, while attacking the Federalist Party and its presidential nominee, John Adams.

Adet claimed that Adams was an enemy of France, which was accurate, and was a friend of England – which was an exaggeration. Adet encouraged American friends of France to vote for Jefferson; Federalists responded by attacking Adet for interfering in American politics. The French First Republic responded with a decree announcing seizures of American ships in the West Indies, and that American sailors in British service would be treated as pirates. In effect, a limited maritime war against American commerce began a few days before Adams was inaugurated in 1797. Adams responded by calling a special session of Congress, asking it to enact defense measures to prepare for war. However, he also sent a special mission to France to resolve the dispute. The mission proved to be a disaster called the XYZ Affair. It led to an undeclared war called the Quasi-War.

The foreign intrigue France perpetrated was unsuccessful, as Adams won the election with an electoral vote count of 71–68. A significant factor in thwarting the French efforts was George Washington's Farewell Address, which condemned foreign meddling in America.

== See also ==
- Chemical revolution
- Diplomacy of John Adams
- Saint-Domingue

== Sources ==
- DeConde, Alexander (1963), A History of American Foreign Policy, New York, NY: Charles Scribner's Sons.
- Priestley, Joseph (1797). Considerations on the Doctrine of Phlogiston, and the Decomposition of Water. Vol. 2. Philadelphia: Printed by Thomas Dobson.
