= European Physical Journal E =

European Physical Journal E: Soft Matter and Biological Physics
- Discipline: Soft Matter and Biophysics
- Language: English
- Edited by: F. Croccolo, G. Fragneto and H. Stark

Publication details
- History: 2000–present
- Publisher: Springer Science+Business Media
- Frequency: Monthly
- Impact factor: 1.890 (2020)

Standard abbreviations
- ISO 4: Eur. Phys. J. E

Indexing
- CODEN: EPJSFH
- ISSN: 1292-8941 (print); 1292-895X (web)
- LCCN: 00252059
- OCLC no.: 43386567

Links
- Journal homepage

The European Physical Journal E: Soft Matter and Biological Physics is a scientific journal focusing on the physics of soft matter and biophysics. It publishes papers describing advances in the understanding of physical aspects of soft, liquid and living systems. This includes reports of experimental, computational and theoretical studies and appeals to the broad interdisciplinary communities including physics, chemistry, biology and materials science.

Topics covered include:

Soft matter

- Polymers and polyelectrolytes
- Liquid crystals
- Macromolecular self-assembly
- Colloids and nanoparticles
- Granular matter
- Nanodevices (smart materials)
- Surface physics

Biological physics

- Biological matter (RNA, DNA, chromatin, ...)
- Structure and function of nanostructures
- Biomimetics
- Cellular processes
- Multicellular systems (Tissue, organs)
- Biological networks

== See also ==
- European Physical Journal
