= European Physical Journal A =

European Physical Journal A: Hadrons and Nuclei
- Discipline: Nuclear Physics
- Language: English
- Edited by: David Blaschke, Thomas Duguet, and Maria Jose Garcia Borge

Publication details
- History: 1998–present
- Publisher: Springer Science+Business Media, EDP Sciences
- Frequency: Monthly
- Impact factor: 3.043 (2020)

Standard abbreviations
- ISO 4: Eur. Phys. J. A

Indexing
- ISSN: 1434-6001 (print); 1434-601X (web)

Links
- Journal homepage

The European Physical Journal A: Hadrons and Nuclei is an academic journal, recognized by the European Physical Society, presenting new and original research results in a variety of formats, including Regular Articles, Reviews, Tools for Experiment and Theory/Scientific Notes and Letters. Topics covered include:

Hadron Physics

- Structure and Dynamics of Hadrons
- Baryon and Meson Spectroscopy
- Hadronic and Electroweak Interactions of Hadrons
- Nonperturbative Approaches to QCD
- Phenomenological Approaches to Hadron Physics

Nuclear Physics

- Nuclear Structure and Reactions
- Structure and function of nanostructures
- Few-Body and Many-Body Systems
- Heavy-Ion Physics
- Hypernuclei
- Radioactive Beams
- Nuclear Astrophysics

== History ==
Prior to 1998, the journal was named Zeitschrift für Physik A Hadrons and Nuclei. Thomas Walcher's term as Editor-in-Chief of EPJ A came to an end in 2006. In January 2007, Enzo de Sanctis started as new Editor-in-Chief and he was joined in July that year by Ulf-G. Meißner, who took charge of the theoretical papers while the experimental papers would be handled by de Sanctis.

== See also ==
- European Physical Journal
