= European Physical Journal C =

European Physical Journal C: Particles and Fields
- Discipline: Physics
- Language: English
- Edited by: Günther Dissertori, Jocelyn Monroe, Dominik J. Schwarz, Kostas Skenderis, and Dieter Zeppenfeld

Publication details
- History: 1998–present
- Publisher: Springer Science+Business Media
- Frequency: 24/year
- Open access: Since 2014
- Impact factor: 4.991 (2021)

Standard abbreviations
- ISO 4: Eur. Phys. J. C

Indexing
- CODEN: EPCFFB
- ISSN: 1434-6044 (print); 1434-6052 (web)
- LCCN: 2004233600
- OCLC no.: 611815602

Links
- Journal homepage

The European Physical Journal C (EPJ C) is a biweekly peer-reviewed, scientific journal covering theoretical and experimental physics. It is part of the SCOAP^{3} initiative since 2014, after which articles are accessible via open access.

== See also ==
- European Physical Journal
