= Association française de mécanique =

Technical organization of France

- Abbreviation: AFM
- Formation: 1997
- Founder: Paul Germain
- Purpose: Scientific Society
- Location: Maison de la Mécanique, Courbevoie, France
- Region served: France
- President: Eric Arquis
- Affiliations: Euromech
- Website: http://afm.asso.fr

The Association française de mécanique (AFM; French Association of Mechanics) was created in 1997 by the union of 17 scientific and engineers societies covering the disciplines of mechanics. It was promoted by the High Mechanical Committee (HCM), with the decisive support of the Federation of Mechanical Industries (FIM), the Technical Center of Mechanical Industries (CETIM) and the University Association in Mechanics (AUM) for the academic part. It is a forum for information, exchange and reflection for the mechanical community: business leaders, engineers, technicians, researchers, professors, mechanical experts. Its main objective is to promote activities and achievements in the main fields of mechanics.

The AFM's operating mode, through its 19 scientific and technical groups (GST) and Commissions, its transversal thematic groups (GTT), the organization of conferences, congress, publication of newsletters and an indexed international journal Mechanics & Industry, aims at the transfer of knowledge and more particularly promotes the "transfer of technologies" from research to industry. It is also meant to represent French mechanics in front of its foreign counterparts. AFM is the referring partner of the French Ministry of Higher Education and Research for all research activities in Mechanics and in close collaboration with the French National Committee of Mechanics (CNFM) which is the link for France with IUTAM (International Union of theoretical and Applied Mechanics).

The AFM organizes every two years a national conference entitled French Congress of Mechanics gathering more than 1000 participants. It is at the initiative of a " Livre blanc de la Mécanique ", which identifies the scientific and technological locks remaining to be lifted in the field.

== The presidents of Association française de mécanique ==
Since 1997, eight presidents have successively headed the association. The current president is Eric Arquis, elected in March 2016.

Nom	Années
Jean-Claude Lachat	1997-2000
Christian Sayettat	2000-2003
Michel Combarnous	2003-2006
Gérard Maeder	2006-2010
Jean-Marc Théret	2010-2013
Claude Quillien	2013-2013
Pierre Devalan	2013-2016
Eric Arquis	2016-2019
