= European Physical Journal =

- Discipline: Physics
- Language: English

Publication details
- Publisher: EDP Sciences, Springer Science+Business Media, Società Italiana di Fisica

Standard abbreviations
- ISO 4: Eur. Phys. J.

Indexing
- EPJ A
- ISSN: 1434-6001 (print); 1434-601X (web)
- EPJ B
- ISSN: 1434-6028 (print); 1434-6036 (web)
- EPJ C
- ISSN: 1434-6044 (print); 1434-6052 (web)
- EPJ D
- ISSN: 1434-6060 (print); 1434-6079 (web)
- EPJ E
- ISSN: 1292-8941 (print); 1292-895X (web)
- EPJ H
- ISSN: 2102-6459 (print); 2102-6467 (web)
- EPJ ST
- ISSN: 1951-6355 (print); 1951-6401 (web)
- EPJ AP
- ISSN: 1286-0042 (print); 1286-0050 (web)
- EPJ Conferences
- ISSN: 2100-014X

Links
- Journal homepage

The European Physical Journal (or EPJ) is a joint publication of EDP Sciences, Springer Science+Business Media, and the Società Italiana di Fisica. It arose in 1998 as a merger and continuation of Acta Physica Hungarica, Anales de Física, Czechoslovak Journal of Physics, Il Nuovo Cimento, Journal de Physique, Portugaliae Physica and Zeitschrift für Physik. The journal is published in various sections, covering all areas of physics.

== History ==
In the late 1990s, Springer and EDP Sciences decided to merge Zeitschrift für Physik and Journal de Physique. With the addition of Il Nuovo Cimento from the Societa Italiana di Fisica, the European Physical Journal commenced publication in January 1998. Now EPJ is a merger and continuation of Acta Physica Hungarica, Anales de Fisica, Czechoslovak Journal of Physics, Il Nuovo Cimento, Journal de Physique, Portugaliae Physica and Zeitschrift für Physik.

The short-lived open-access journal family PhysMath Central was merged in 2011 into the European Physical Journal, which has offered an open-access option since 2006.

== Topics covered ==
The EPJ is published in the following sections:

- European Physical Journal A: Hadrons and Nuclei
- European Physical Journal AM: Applied Metamaterials
- European Physical Journal AP: Applied Physics
- European Physical Journal B: Condensed Matter and Complex Systems
- European Physical Journal C: Particles and Fields
- European Physical Journal D: Atomic, Molecular, Optical and Plasma Physics
- European Physical Journal Data Science: Data Science
- European Physical Journal E: Soft Matter and Biological Physics
- European Physical Journal H: Historical Perspectives on Contemporary Physics
- European Physical Journal N: Nuclear Sciences and Technologies
- European Physical Journal NBP: Nonlinear Biomedical Physics
- European Physical Journal Plus
- European Physical Journal PV: Photovoltaics
- European Physical Journal QT: Quantum Technology
- European Physical Journal RI: Research Infrastructures
- European Physical Journal ST: Special Topics
- European Physical Journal TI: Techniques and Instrumentation
- European Physical Journal WOC: Web of Conferences: journal of conference proceedings

== Controversies ==
In 2023, editors retracted a journal article published in 2022 in European Physical Journal Plus that claimed that did not deny climate change but discussed other possible origins for our changing climate.

The article was widely shared with article metrics showing that the article was in the 99th percentile (ranked 293rd) of the 512,033 tracked articles of a similar age in all journals, and in the 99th percentile (ranked 1st) of the 41 tracked articles of a similar age in European Physical Journal Plus. The article was cited by climate change denialists and in two segments on Sky News Australia (known for climate science misinformation).

The retraction note does not highlight any error, data or image falsification, plagiarism or other reasons that usually justify a retraction: for a reconstruction of what happened, see and where also the reviewers notes can be found.
