= Diplomacy of John Adams =

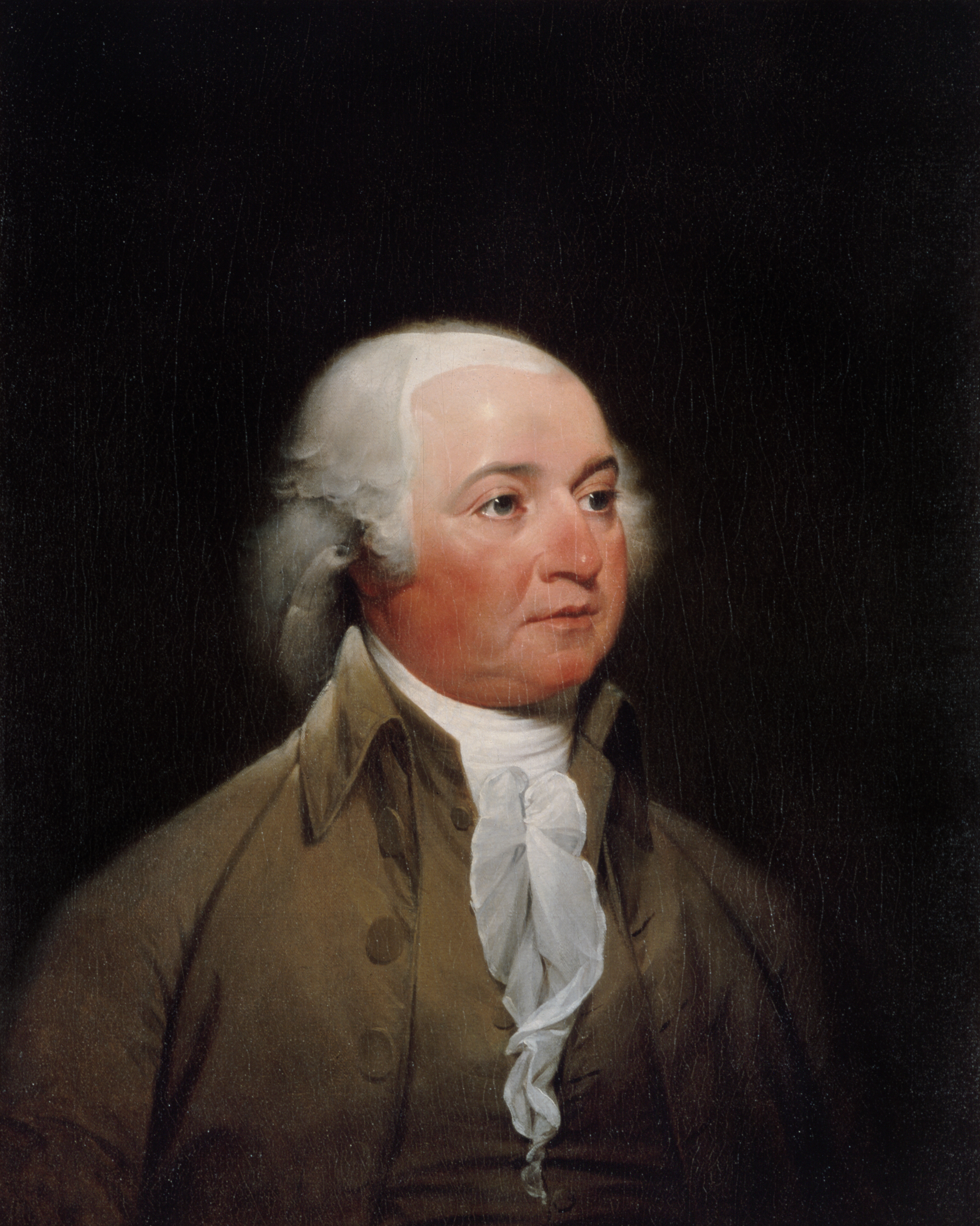
Vice President Adams in 1793 by John Trumbull

John Adams (1735–1826) was an American Founding Father who served as one of the most important diplomats on behalf of the new United States during the American Revolution. He served as minister to the Kingdom of France and the Dutch Republic and then helped negotiate the Treaty of Paris to end the American Revolutionary War.

Adams served as the first minister to the Court of St James's (Great Britain). Relations with France dominated diplomacy during his presidency (1797–1801). American anger at French insults in the XYZ Affair of 1797–1798 escalated into an undeclared naval war, called the Quasi-War. One wing of his Federalist Party that was led by his rival, Alexander Hamilton, demanded an all-out war. He rejected it and secured peace with France in 1800.

== Early stages of the Revolution ==
In the spring of 1776, Adams advocated on the floor of the Second Continental Congress that independence was necessary to establish trade and that trade was essential for the attainment of independence. He specifically urged negotiation of a commercial treaty with France. He was then appointed, along with Benjamin Franklin, John Dickinson, Benjamin Harrison V, and Robert Morris, "to prepare a plan of treaties to be proposed to foreign powers." While Jefferson was laboring over the Declaration of Independence, Adams worked on the Model Treaty, which authorized a commercial agreement with France but contained no provisions for formal recognition or military assistance. There were provisions for what constituted French territory. The treaty adhered to the provision that "free ships make free goods", which allowed neutral nations to trade reciprocally but exempted an agreed-upon list of contraband.

In early September 1776, after the British victory at the Battle of Long Island, Admiral Lord Richard Howe, having been appointed Acting Peace Commissioner, met with Adams, Franklin, and Edward Rutledge to hold peace discussions. The Americans insisted that any negotiations required British recognition of their independence. Howe stated he did not have the authority to meet that demand, and the British resumed the campaign. In October 1777, the Americans captured the British invasion army at Saratoga in upstate New York, and France was ready to recognize the US and to join the war.

== Commissioner to France ==
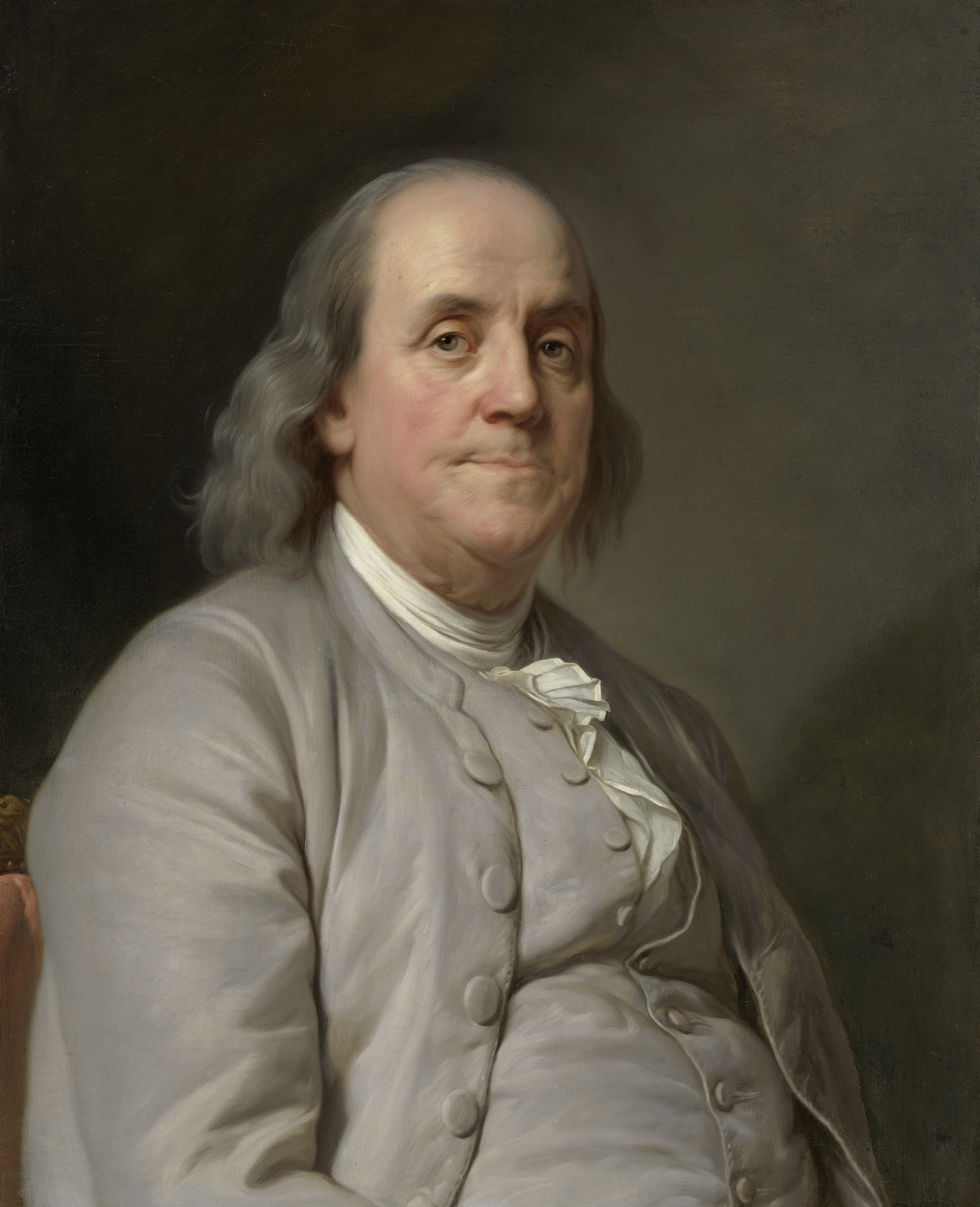
Adams frequently clashed with Benjamin Franklin over how to manage French relations.

On November 27, 1777, Adams was named as commissioner to France and replaced Silas Deane. He accepted at once. He was to join Franklin and Arthur Lee in Paris to negotiate an alliance with the French, who were debating whether or not they would recognize and aid the United States. On April 1, he arrived in Spain, where Adams learned that France had already agreed to an alliance with the United States on February 6. Adams was annoyed by the other two commissioners: Lee, whom he thought to be paranoid and cynical, and the popular and influential Franklin, whom he found irritating, lethargic, and overly deferential and accommodating to the French. He took a disliking to Dr. Edward Bancroft, Franklin's advisor who was later shown to be a British spy. Adams did not speak French, the international language of diplomacy at the time, which made him assume a less visible role, but Adams emerged as the commission's chief administrator, who imposed order and methods lacking in his delegation's finances and recordkeeping affairs. Adams was frustrated by the lack of commitment on the part of the French to helping the United States. In December, he wrote a letter to French foreign minister, the Comte de Vergennes, to argue for French naval support in North America. Although Franklin toned down the letter, Vergennes ignored it. In September 1778, Congress increased Franklin's powers by naming him minister plenipotentiary to France while Lee was sent to serve in Spain. Adams received no instructions on where to go or what to do next. Disgusted by the apparent slight, he departed France on March 8, 1779.

In the fall of 1779, Adams was appointed sole minister charged with negotiating peace and a postwar commercial treaty with Britain. After the conclusion of the Massachusetts constitutional convention, at which he drafted the state constitution, he departed for Europe in November aboard the French frigate Sensible and was accompanied by John Quincy and 9-year-old son Charles.

In France, constant disagreement between Lee and Franklin eventually resulted in Adams assuming the role of tie-breaker in almost all votes on commission business. Adams also increased his usefulness by mastering the French language. Lee was eventually recalled. Adams closely supervised his sons' education but wrote to his wife, Abigail, relatively infrequently, only about once every ten days.

Compared to Franklin, Adams held a distinctly pessimistic view of the Franco-American alliance. Adams believed the French to be involved only for their own self-interest, and he grew frustrated by what he perceived to be lethargy in providing substantial aid to the U.S. "It is interest alone which does it," he said, "and it is interest alone which can be trusted." Adams wrote that the French meant to keep their hands "above our chin to prevent us from drowning, but not to lift our heads out of water." His straightforward manner eventually led to a collision with Vergennes.

In March 1780, Congress, trying to curb inflation, voted to devalue the dollar. In June, Vergennes summoned Adams for a meeting. In a letter sent that same month, he insisted that any fluctuation of the dollar value without an exception for French merchants was unacceptable and requested for Adams to write to Congress asking it to "retrace its steps." Adams wrote back in defense of the decision and claimed that the French merchants were doing better than Vergennes had implied. Adams also used the letter to sound off on some of his grievances with the French. The alliance had been made over two years earlier, and an army, under the Comte de Rochambeau, had been sent to assist Washington but had yet to do anything of significance. The U.S. was expecting French warships, which Adams wrote were needed to contain the British armies in the port cities and to contend with the powerful British Navy. However, the French Navy had been sent not to the United States but to the West Indies so that it could protect French interests there. Adams believed that France needed to commit itself more fully to the alliance. Vergennes responded that he would deal only with Franklin, who had sent a letter back to Congress that criticized Adams:

having nothing else wherewith to employ himself, he seems to have endeavored to supply what he may suppose my negotiations defective in. He thinks, as he tells himself, that America has been to free in her expressions of gratitude to France; for that she is more obliged to us than we to her and that we should show spirit in our applications. I apprehend that he mistakes his ground, and that this court is to be treated with decency and delicacy.

Before a response could be sent, Adams had left France on his own.

== Minister to the Dutch Republic ==
In the summer of 1780, Adams went to the Dutch Republic. Since it was one of the few other republics in the world, Adams thought that the Dutch might be sympathetic to the American cause. Securing a loan from them could increase American independence from France, which was bankrolling the war and supplying army troops and its navy, and pressure Britain into peace.

At first, Adams had no official status, but in July, he was named envoy and took up residence in Amsterdam in August. Adams, at first, thought the chances of success quite good, and he greatly enjoyed the city. He soon found himself disappointed. Adams did not understand the very complicated system of government in the Dutch Republic, not knowing where sovereignty lay or how decisions were taken, or how he might influence them. "The constitution of government is so complicated and whimsical a thinking, and the temper and character of the nation so peculiar, that this is considered everywhere as the most difficult Embassy in Europe." Also hindering his mission was the language barrier; he did not speak Dutch, and the Dutch did not speak either English or French, but a Dutch emigrant to South Carolina, Alexander Gillon, now back in Rotterdam on business, helped with translation. The Dutch, fearing British retaliation, refused to meet Adams. Meanwhile, word reached Europe of American defeats at Charleston and Camden as well as the betrayal of Benedict Arnold. After the discovery of secret aid that had already been sent by the Dutch to the Americans, the British authorized reprisals against Dutch ships, which only increased their apprehension. After five months of not meeting with a single Dutch official, Adams, in early 1781, pronounced Amsterdam "the capital of the reign of Mammon."

He was finally invited to present his credentials to the Dutch on April 19, 1781, but no assistance was promised. In the meantime, Adams thwarted an attempt by neutral European powers to mediate the war without the U.S. being consulted.

In July 1781, Adams consented to the departure of both of his sons. Francis Dana, Adams's secretary, was assigned to go to Saint Petersburg to seek recognition from Russia. Knowing little French, Dana received Adams's permission to bring with him John Quincy, who was fluent in the language. Charles, who was desirous to return home, left for Massachusetts with Adams's friend Benjamin Waterhouse. In August, shortly after he was removed as the sole negotiator of the treaty to end the war, Adams fell seriously ill in what one scholar calls "a major nervous breakdown." In November, he learned that American and French troops had won the decisive victory over British troops at Yorktown with the crucial assistance of the French Navy, which vindicated Adams's stand for increased naval assistance from France.

News of the American triumph at Yorktown convulsed Europe. In January 1781, after recovering, Adams arrived at The Hague to demand for the States General of the Netherlands to answer his petitions. His efforts stalled, and he took his cause to the people by successfully capitalizing on popular pro-American sentiment to push the States General towards recognizing U.S. independence, which was done by several provinces. On April 19, 1782, the States General formally recognized American independence and acknowledged Adams as envoy.

Ferling, however, downplays Adams's efforts and argues that it was the success of Yorktown, combined with pressure put on the Dutch by the French, to have been chiefly responsible for the recognition of independence.

With the aid of the Dutch Patriot leader Joan Derk van der Capellen tot den Pol, Adams negotiated a loan of five million guilders, financed by Nicolaas van Staphorst and Willem Willink, on June 11. In October 1782, he negotiated with the Dutch a treaty of amity and commerce. The house that Adams bought during his stay became the first American-owned embassy on foreign soil.

== Peace treaty negotiations ==
After negotiating the loan with the Dutch, Adams was appointed as one of the American commissioners to negotiate the Treaty of Paris to end the war. Since Vergennes still disapproved of Adams, which caused Franklin, Thomas Jefferson, John Jay, and Henry Laurens to be appointed to collaborate with Adams; nevertheless, Jefferson did not go to Europe, and Laurens was posted to the Dutch Republic.

Jay, Adams, and Franklin played the major part in the final negotiations. One of the most important goals for the Americans became surprisingly difficult but Adams played an important role in resolving it: the securing of fishing rights off Newfoundland and Cape Breton Island. The British ministers proposed strict limitations on how close American fishermen could be to the Canadian shore. Adams insisted for American fishermen to be allowed to travel as close to the shore as they wished, and that they should be allowed even to cure their ships on the shores off Newfoundland. Referring to that and other demands, Vergennes, through an emissary, secretly informed the British that France did not feel compelled to "sustain [these] pretentious ambitions." Overruling Franklin and distrustful of Vergennes, Jay and Adams decided not to consult with France but dealt directly with the British commissioners.

Adams strongly felt that the U.S. should make peace with Britain separately, in violation of both the wishes of Congress and the terms of the 1778 Treaty of Alliance with France. Adams feared that Congress, Franklin, and Vergennes would tie the U.S. too closely to European affairs. On November 30, 1782, the American commissioners signed a preliminary peace treaty with Britain, but it was not to go into effect until France had made peace as well.

Adams told the British that the fishing terms proposed to them were more generous than those that had been proposed by France in 1778, which would create goodwill towards Britain in the U.S. and also put pressure on France. Britain agreed to that, and both sides worked out a number of other provisions. Vergennes angrily expressed his disappointment when he learned from Franklin of U.S. duplicity but did not demand renegotiation. Supposedly, he was surprised at how much the American ministers had been able to extract from the British. The independent negotiations also allowed the French to plead innocence to their Spanish allies, who were angry that Britain still held Gibraltar and worried that it might attempt to retake Florida. Attempting to incorporate Spanish demands might have caused significant problems during the negotiations.

On September 3, 1783, the treaty was signed with French approval, and the British recognized the U.S. as an independent nation.

In 1784 and 1785, Adams was one of the architects of extensive trade relations between the United States and Prussia. The Prussian ambassador in The Hague, Friedrich Wilhelm von Thulemeyer, was involved, as were Jefferson and Franklin, who were in Paris.

== Minister to Great Britain ==
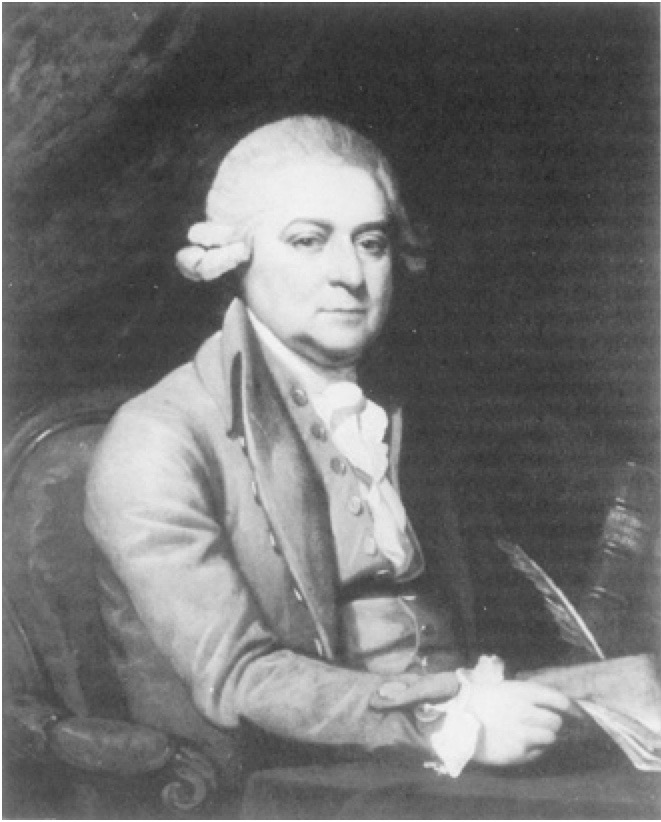
Adams – 1785 Mather Brown Portrait

Adams was appointed in 1785 the first American minister to the Court of St James's (envoy to Great Britain). He had his first audience with King George III on June 1. Adams approached the king, bowed three times, and promised to do all that he could to restore friendship and cordiality between people separated by an ocean and "have the Same Language, a Similar Religion and kindred Blood." The king agreed and added that "while he had been the last to consent" to American independence, he wished Adams to know that he had always done what he thought right and proper. He inquired, "There is an Opinion, among Some People, that you are not the most attached of all Your Countrymen, to the manners of France." Adams replied, "That Opinion sir, is not mistaken, I must avow to your Majesty, I have no Attachments but to my own Country." George responded, "An honest Man will never have any other."

During her visit to Washington, D.C., to mark the bicentennial of American independence in 1976, Queen Elizabeth II gave historical perspective to Adams's service: "John Adams, America's first ambassador, said to my ancestor, King George III, that it was his desire to help with the restoration of 'the old good nature and the old good humour between our peoples.' That restoration has long been made, and the links of language, tradition, and personal contact have maintained it."

Adams was joined by his wife while in London; suffering the hostility of the king's courtiers, they chose to escape when they could by seeking out Richard Price, the minister of Newington Green Unitarian Church and instigator of the Revolution Controversy. Jefferson visited Britain for a time in 1786 while serving as Minister to France. He and Adams toured the countryside and saw many of Britain's most important historical sites. During his time in London, Adams briefly met his old friend Jonathan Sewall, but they discovered that they had grown too far apart to renew their friendship. Adams considered Sewall one of the war's casualties. Sewall, in turn, offered a critique of Adams as an envoy:

His abilities are undoubtedly equal to the mechanical parts of his business as ambassador; but this is not enough. He cannot dance, drink, game, flatter, promise, dress, swear with the gentlemen, and small talk and flirt with the ladies; in short, he has none of those essential arts or ornaments which constitute a courtier. There are thousands who, with a tenth of his understanding and without a spark of his honesty, would distance him infinitely in any court in Europe.

Adams's tenure in Britain was complicated by the failure of both countries to follow their treaty obligations. Both had been delinquent in paying debts owed to British merchants. As security for these payments, the British refused to evacuate forts in the Northwest, as had been prescribed the Treaty of Paris. Adams's attempts to resolve this dispute failed, and he was often frustrated by a lack of news from home. He corresponded with his sons John Quincy and Charles, both of whom were at Harvard, cautioning the former against the "smell of the midnight lamp" and admonishing the latter to devote sufficient time to study. Adams grew frustrated with the situation in Great Britain, and letters detailing tumult at home such as in Shays' Rebellion heightened his anxiety. He wrote to Jay to ask to be relieved.

In 1788, Adams took his leave of the king, who engaged Adams in polite and formal conversation and promised to uphold his end of the treaty once the U.S. did the same. He then went to The Hague to take formal leave and to secure refinancing to allow the U.S. to meet obligations on earlier Dutch loans.

== Presidency ==
Diplomatic relations with France were a top priority during the presidency of John Adams, 1797-1801. Tensions escalated into an undeclared war. Adams finally managed to resolve the crisis.

In 1796, as Adams faced Jefferson in the presidential contest, the French minister Pierre Adet decided that Adams was an enemy of France, which was accurate, and was a friend of England – which was an exaggeration. Adet encouraged American friends of France to vote for Jefferson; Federalists responded by attacking Adet for interfering in American politics. Republican France responded with a decree announcing seizures of American ships in the West Indies, and that American sailors in British service would be treated as pirates. In effect, a limited maritime war against American commerce began a few days before Adams was inaugurated. Adams responded by calling a special session of Congress, asking it to enact defense measures to prepare for war. However, he also sent a special mission to France to resolve the dispute. The mission proved to be a disaster called the XYZ Affair. It led to an undeclared war called the Quasi-War.

Adams sent Charles Cotesworth Pinckney, John Marshall, and Elbridge Gerry. They were approached through informal channels by agents of the French Foreign Minister Talleyrand, who demanded bribes and a loan before formal negotiations could begin. Although such demands were not uncommon in European diplomacy of the time, the Americans were offended by them, and eventually left France without ever engaging in formal negotiations. Gerry, seeking to avoid all-out war, remained for several months after the other two commissioners left. His exchanges with Talleyrand laid groundwork for the eventual end to diplomatic and military hostilities.

=== Quasi-War ===
The failure of the American commission caused a political firestorm in the United States when its commission's dispatches were published. It led to the undeclared Quasi-War (1798 to 1800). Federalists linked to Hamilton who controlled the government took advantage of the national anger to build up the nation's military. A new army was created with George Washington in nominal control, and Hamilton in actual charge They also attacked the Jeffersonian Republicans for their pro-French stance, and Elbridge Gerry (a nonpartisan at the time) for what they saw as his role in the commission's failure.

The war was called "quasi" because it was undeclared. It involved two years of hostilities at sea, in which both navies attacked the other's shipping in the West Indies. The unexpected fighting ability of the U.S. Navy, which destroyed the French West Indian trade, together with the growing weaknesses and final overthrow of the ruling Directory in France, led foreign minister Talleyrand to reopen negotiations.

At the same time, there was an escalation of the battle between Adams and Hamilton over control of the national policy. Adams took sudden and unexpected action, rejecting the anti-French hawks in his own party and offering peace to France. In 1800 he sent William Vans Murray to France to negotiate peace; the Federalists cried betrayal but the peace process worked. The Quasi War ended with the signing of the Convention of 1800. It released the United States from its first entangling alliance – the next one would take place in World War II. For France, the convention was the first diplomatic step by Napoleon and his pacification policies.

=== Haiti ===
Haiti, then known as Saint-Domingue, was a French colony whose black slaves had successfully revolted and created a new government. In 1798, Adams made the U.S. the first and only nation to recognize a member of the African diaspora, Toussaint Louverture, as a de facto head of state.

The main goals were to weaken France during the Quasi-War and to attempt to seek an advantage in the Caribbean trade. Adams disliked slavery and had experience in negotiating with the Barbary states. His Secretary of State, Timothy Pickering, likewise was anti-slavery and played a key role.

=== Cherokee Treaty ===
The inauguration speech of Adams referenced the need for negotiations with the Indians for peaceful relations on the frontier and the Treaty of Tellico signed on October 2, 1798 was his administration's singular treaty with Native Americans.

== Bibliography ==
=== Secondary sources ===
- Abrams, Jeanne E. A View from Abroad: The Story of John and Abigail Adams in Europe (New York UP, 2021) review
- Anderson, William G. "John Adams, the Navy, and the Quasi-War with France." American Neptune 30 (1970): 117–132.
- Bauer, Jean. "With Friends Like These: John Adams and the Comte de Vergennes on Franco-American Relations." Diplomatic History 37.4 (2013): 664–692.
- Bemis, Samuel Flagg. The Diplomacy of the American Revolution (1935) online free to borrow.
- Clarfield, Gerard H. Timothy Pickering and American Diplomacy, 1795–1800 (1969).
- DeConde, Alexander (1963), A History of American Foreign Policy, New York, NY: Charles Scribner's Sons.
- DeConde, Alexander (1966), The Quasi-War: The Politics and Diplomacy of the Undeclared War with France, 1797-1801.
- Dull, Jonathan R. "Franklin the diplomat: The French mission." Transactions of the American Philosophical Society 72.1 (1982): 1-76. online
- Dull, Jonathan R. A Diplomatic History of American Revolution (1985).
- Ferling, John E. (1992). John Adams: A Life. Knoxville, TN: University of Tennessee Press. ISBN 978-08704-9730-8..
- Graebner, Norman A., Richard Dean Burns, and Joseph M. Siracusa. Foreign Affairs and the Founding Fathers: From Confederation to Constitution, 1776–1787 (Praeger, 2011) 199 pp.
- Greenstein, Fred I. "Presidential difference in the early republic: The highly disparate leadership styles of Washington, Adams, and Jefferson." Presidential Studies Quarterly 36#3 (2006): 373–390.
- Hill, Peter P. William Vans Murray, Federalist diplomat: the shaping of peace with France, 1797-1801 (1971).
- Holdzkom, Marianne. Remembering John Adams: The Second President in History, Memory and Popular Culture (McFarland, 2023) online.
- Johnson, Ronald Angelo. Diplomacy in Black and White: John Adams, Toussaint Louverture, and Their Atlantic World Alliance (2014)
- Johnson, Ronald Angelo. "A Revolutionary Dinner: US Diplomacy toward Saint Domingue, 1798—1801." Early American Studies (2011): 114–141.
- Kaplan, Lawrence S. "The treaty of Paris, 1783: A historiographical challenge." International History Review 5#3 (1983): 431–442.
- Kurtz, Stephen G. The Presidency of John Adams: The Collapse of Federalism, 1795–1800 (1957)
- Kurtz, Stephen G. "The French Mission of 1799-1800: Concluding Chapter in the Statecraft of John Adams." Political Science Quarterly 80#4 (1965): 543–557.
- Lyon, E. Wilson. "The Franco-American Convention of 1800". Journal of Modern History (1940). 12#3 (1940) pp 305–33. online
- McCullough, David (2001). John Adams. New York, NY: Simon & Schuster. p. 144. ISBN 978-14165-7588-7.
- Morris, Richard B. The Peacemakers: The Great Powers and American Independence (1983)
- Murphy, William J. "John Adams: The Politics of the Additional Army, 1798-1800." New England Quarterly (1979): 234–249. online
- Perl-Rosenthal, Nathan. "Private letters and public diplomacy: The Adams network and the quasi-War, 1797–1798." Journal of the Early Republic 31.2 (2011): 283–311. online
- Ray, Thomas M. "'Not One Cent for Tribute': The Public Addresses and American Popular Reaction to the XYZ Affair, 1798-1799." Journal of the Early Republic 3.4 (1983): 389-412. online
- Scherr, Arthur. John Adams, slavery, and race: ideas, politics, and diplomacy in an age of crisis (ABC-CLIO, 2018) online.
- Schulte Nordholt, Jan Willem. The Dutch Republic and American Independence. Chapel Hill: University of North Carolina Press 1982. ISBN 0807815306
- Sidak, J. Gregory. "The Quasi War Cases-And Their Relevance to Whether Letters of Marque and Reprisal Constrain Presidential War Powers." Harvard Journal of Law & Public Policy 8 (2004): 465+ online.
- Smith, Page (1962a). John Adams. Vol. I, 1735–1784. New York, NY: Doubleday & Company, Inc. ISBN 9780837123486. OCLC 852986601.
- Smith, Page (1962b). John Adams. Vol. II, 1784–1826. New York, NY: Doubleday & Company, Inc. ISBN 9780837123486. OCLC 852986620.
- Stinchcombe, William. "The Diplomacy of the WXYZ Affair." William and Mary Quarterly (1977) 34#4: 590–617. online
- Van Cleave, Peter D. "The Dutch Origins of the Quasi War: John Adams, the Netherlands, and Atlantic Politics in the 1790s." Journal of Early American History 8.1 (2018): 30-59.
- Varg, Paul A. Foreign Policies Of The Founding Fathers (1964) online free
- Waldstreicher, David, ed. A Companion to John Adams and John Quincy Adams (2013)
- Young C.J. "Serenading the President: John Adams, the XYZ Affair, and the 18th-Century American Presidency" Federal History (2014), vol. 6, pp. 108–122.

=== Primary sources ===
- Adams, John; Adams, Charles Francis (1851). The Works of John Adams, Second President of the United States: Autobiography, continued. Diary. Essays and controversial papers of the Revolution. The Works of John Adams, Second President of the United States. Vol. 3. Little, Brown.
