= China Science Publishing & Media =

Scientific press in China

- Status: Active
- Founded: 1 August 1954
- Headquarters location: Beijing
- Owner(s): Chinese Academy of Sciences
- Official website: www.sciencep.com

China Science Publishing & Media (CSPM, traditional Chinese: 科學出版社; simplified Chinese: 科学出版社), also translated into English as Sciences Press, Science Publishing House, or China Science Publishing, is a People's Republic of China-based publishing house, which mainly publishes academic books and journals, headquartered in Beijing.

It is the largest comprehensive scientific, technical and professional publisher in China. The Science Press was officially established on 1 August 1954 as the part of the Chinese Academy of Sciences, following a merger between the former Compilation and Translation Bureau of Chinese Academy of Sciences (中国科学院编译局) and Longmen United Company (龙门联合书局), which was founded in the 1930s.

== Important published books ==
- Thomas Henry Huxley. Evolution and Ethics and Other Essays (进化论与伦理学), 1971.
- George Gamow. One Two Three...Infinity: Facts and Speculations of Science (从一到无穷大：科学中的事实和臆测), 1978.
- Advanced Artificial Intelligence (高级人工智能), 1998.
- Intelligent Agent and its Application (智能主体及其应用), 2000.

== See also ==
- Academic publishing in China
- China Social Sciences Publishing House
- Science and technology in the People's Republic of China
