= Italian Physical Society =

The Italian Physical Society (Italian: Società Italiana di Fisica, SIF) is a non-profit organization whose aim is to promote, encourage, protect the study and the progress of physics in Italy and in the world. It was founded in 1897.

It is associated with the journal series Nuovo Cimento. SIF also publishes the academic journals Quaderni di Storia della Fisica and Giornale di Fisica. Some of the Nuovo Cimento journals were merged with European Physical Journal in 1986 and with Europhysics Letters in 1999. Il Bolletino della Società Italiana di Fisica was published from 1956 to 1984. In 1984, it became Il Nuovo Saggiatore ("The New Assayer"). The SIF organizes an annual national congress of study at one of the Italian universities. Its other major initiatives are the management of the "Enrico Fermi" International School of Physics "Enrico Fermi" (an annual summer school held in Varenna), and the organization of conferences on specific topics.

There are two types of membership in SIF: regular members ("can be effective partners individuals and charities") and honorary members ("may be honorary members persons who have attained an eminent position in the physical science").

Franco Bassani of the Scuola Normale di Pisa was president of the SIF until 2007. The current president is Luisa Cifarelli of the University of Bologna, formerly Vice President.
