= Knowledge and Management of Aquatic Ecosystems =

Peer-reviewed scientific journal

- Discipline: Ecology
- Language: English
- Edited by: Thierry Oberdorff

Publication details
- Former name: Bulletin Français de la Pêche et de la Pisciculture
- History: 1928–present
- Publisher: EDP Sciences (France)
- Frequency: Upon acceptance
- Open access: Yes
- License: Creative Commons
- Impact factor: 1.928 (2021)

Standard abbreviations
- ISO 4: Knowl. Manag. Aquat. Ecosyst.

Indexing
- ISSN: 1961-9502
- OCLC no.: 236201500

Links
- Journal homepage; Online access

Knowledge and Management of Aquatic Ecosystems is a peer-reviewed open access scientific journal covering management and conservation issues related to freshwater ecosystems. The journal publishes articles, short communications, reviews, comments and replies. It is published by EDP Sciences and the editor-in-chief is Thierry Oberdorff (IRD). The journal was established in 1928 as Bulletin Français de la Pêche et de la Pisciculture and obtained its current title in 2008.

An editorial published in 2002 by the outgoing editor Erick Vigneux, celebrates the 75-year anniversary of the journal. In this celebratory editorial, it is explained that 'Knowledge and management of aquatic ecosystems' was introduced as a subtitle for the journal name in 1996.

== Abstracting and indexing ==
The journal is abstracted and indexed in:

- BIOSIS Previews
- Current Contents/Agriculture, Biology & Environmental Sciences
- DOAJ
- Science Citation Index Expanded
- Scopus
- The Zoological Record

According to the Journal Citation Reports, the journal has a 2021 impact factor of 1.928.

== New species first described in this journal ==
Occasionally new species have been first described in this journal. For example:

- The freshwater goby Stiphodon julieni was first described from specimens collected on Rapa in French Polynesia, in this journal in 2002.
- The freshwater goby Lentipes kaaea was first described in this journal in 2002.
- The characiform fish Tometes lebaili was first described in this journal in 2002.
- The freshwater prawn Macrobrachium feunteuni was first described in this journal in 2002.
