= EDP Sciences =

French scientific publisher

- Founded: 1920; 106 years ago
- Country of origin: France
- Headquarters location: Les Ulis
- Nonfiction topics: Chemistry, Engineering & Technology, General Knowledge, Health Sciences & Dentistry, Life Sciences, Mathematics & Computer Sciences, Physics & Astronomy, Social Sciences & Humanities
- Owner: China Science Publishing & Media
- Official website: www.edpsciences.org

EDP Sciences (Édition Diffusion Presse Sciences) is an STM publisher that disseminates scientific information for specialist and more general audiences (general public, decision-makers, teachers, etc.). EDP produces and publishes international journals, books, conferences, and websites with predominantly scientific and technical content. Originally a joint venture of four French learned societies in science, mathematics, and medicine, the company was acquired by China Science Publishing & Media in 2019.

== History ==
The company was founded in 1920 under the name La Société du Journal de Physique et Le Radium. It thus took over the publication of the Journal de Physique (established in 1872) on the occasion of its merger with the journal Le Radium (established in 1904). Among the founders were the Société Française de Physique and several notable scientists and industrialists: Antoine Béclère, Louis de Broglie, Marie Curie, Paul Langevin, Louis Lumière, Jean Perrin, and Léon Brillouin, as well as patrons such as Albert I, Prince of Monaco.

The company continued to publish the different sections of the Journal de Physique until the 1980s, at which point its journal publishing expanded into other areas of physics, particularly astrophysics. The company also began publishing books.

In 1997, the publisher broadened further to reach other scientific markets, and changed its name to Édition Diffusion Presse Sciences (more commonly shortened to EDP Sciences, including in the company's own marketing materials).

EDP Sciences today publishes almost 50 international paper and electronic journals and magazines, as well as about a hundred websites and a variety of annual and monograph books. While the publisher was originally owned by four learned societies: the Société Française de Physique, the Société Chimique de France, the Société de Mathématiques Appliquées et Industrielles, and the Société Française d'Optique, it was acquired in 2019 by China Science Publishing & Media.

== Publications ==
Across its divisions, EDP Science publishes in the following subject areas: chemistry; general knowledge; mathematics and computer science; health sciences and dentistry; physics, astronomy, and astrophysics; engineering and technology; social sciences and humanities; life sciences.

The company publishes more than 50 scientific journals, both paper and electronic, and also a number of professional magazines (mostly French-language) in the physics domain (Photoniques, Europhysics News, and others) and in health sciences (Audio Infos, Basse Vision Infos, L'Entreprise officinale, Orthophile, Indépendentaire, etc.).

EDP Science manages the annual publishing of several undergraduate teaching texts, other professional books, and popular-science books, and also publishes monographs at masters-degree level and higher.

Examples of EDP journals
Title	Themes	Scientific partnership
Astronomy and Astrophysics	Astronomy and Astrophysics, Physics	European Southern Observatory (ESO)
ESAIM: Control, Optimisation and Calculus of Variations	Mathematics and Computer Science	Société de Mathématiques Appliquées et Industrielles (SMAI)
ESAIM: Mathematical Modelling and Numerical Analysis	Mathematics and Computer Science	Société de Mathématiques Appliquées et Industrielles (SMAI)
European Physical Journal Applied Physics (EPJ AP)	Engineering & Technology, Physics	CNRS – European Physical Society (EPS)
Hydroécologie appliquée	Engineering & Technology, Social Sciences & Humanities, General Knowledge, Health Sciences, Life Sciences	EDF
Knowledge and Management of Aquatic Ecosystems (KMAE)	Life Sciences	Office national de l'eau et des milieux aquatiques (ONEMA)
Mécanique et industrie	Engineering & Technology, Physics	Association française de mécanique (AFM)
L'Orthodontie française	Health Sciences & Dentistry	Société française d'orthopédie dento-faciale (SFODF)
Parasite	Life Sciences	Société Française de Parasitologie
Revue d'Orthopédie Dento-Faciale	Health Sciences & Dentistry	Association de la Revue d’Orthopédie Dento-Faciale
Visualized Cancer Medicine	Health Sciences, Medicine	Society of Tumor Microenvironment, China Anti-Cancer Association

== Open access ==
EDP Sciences supports the development of open-access journals. Part of its catalogue of journals is already in total (gold) or partial (green) open access, and it is rated a "green publisher" by the SHERPA/RoMEO site. EDP is also a member of the Open Access Scholarly Publishers Association (OASPA), a trade association of OA publishers in all scientific, technical, and scholarly disciplines.

== Web of Conferences ==
Web of Conferences is an online portal entirely dedicated to scientific conferences. It offers an international meetings calendar and a space collecting all the conference proceedings published by EDP Sciences. It also provides a proceedings-publishing service.
