= Index of physics articles (E) =

The index of physics articles is split into multiple pages due to its size.

To navigate by individual letter use the table of contents below.

== E ==
- E-folding
- E. Peter Raynes
- E872 experiment
- E=MC2 (disambiguation)
- Experimental Advanced Superconducting Tokamak (EAST)
- EBOR
- ECHIDNA
- EDELWEISS
- EGS (program)
- ELETTRA
- EMF meter
- EMMA (accelerator)
- ENGIN-X
- EN 207
- EPICS
- EPOXI
- EPR paradox
- ERF damper
- ETDEWEB
- ETH Laboratory of Ion Beam Physics
- Earl W. McDaniel
- Earle Hesse Kennard
- Earle M. Terry
- Earnshaw's theorem
- Earth's magnetic field
- Earth's shadow
- Earth, Moon, and Planets
- Earth-Moon barycenter
- Earth and Planetary Science Letters
- Earth tide
- Earth–ionosphere waveguide
- Eastman Jacobs
- Easy Java Simulations
- Easy axis
- Ebullioscopic constant
- Eccentric anomaly
- Eccentricity vector
- Echea
- Echo (phenomenon)
- Echo chamber
- Echogenicity
- Eckert number
- Eckman number
- Eclipse
- Ecliptic
- Economizer
- Econophysics
- Ectropy
- Ed Grothus
- Ed Lu
- Ed Seidel
- Eddington luminosity
- Eddington number
- Eddington–Finkelstein coordinates
- Eddy (fluid dynamics)
- Eddy current
- Eddy diffusion
- Eden growth model
- Edgar Buckingham
- Edgar Choueiri
- Edgar D. Zanotto
- Edge-localized mode
- Edge-of-the-wedge theorem
- Edge wave
- Edme Mariotte
- Edmond Halley
- Edmund Clifton Stoner
- Edoardo Amaldi
- Édouard Branly
- Édouard Brézin
- Eduard Grüneisen
- Eduard Prugovečki
- Eduard Shpolsky
- Education and training of electrical and electronics engineers
- Edward A. Guggenheim
- Edward A. Irving
- Edward Alan Knapp
- Edward Andrade
- Edward Arthur Milne
- Edward Bennett (physicist)
- Edward Bennett Rosa
- Edward Bouchet
- Edward Bullard
- Edward Condon
- Edward Drobyshevski
- Edward George Bowen
- Edward Hinds
- Edward J. Lofgren
- Edward Kasner
- Edward Kolb
- Edward L. Wright
- Edward Leamington Nichols
- Edward Lee (scientist)
- Edward Mills Purcell
- Edward Morley
- Edward Nairne
- Edward P. Ney
- Edward Pigot
- Edward Ramberg
- Edward Salisbury Dana
- Edward Samuel Ritchie
- Edward Spiegel
- Edward Teller
- Edward Tryon
- Edward Victor Appleton
- Edward W. Piotrowski
- Edward Witten
- Edwin Bidwell Wilson
- Edwin C. Kemble
- Edwin F. Taylor
- Edwin Fitch Northrup
- Edwin Hall
- Edwin Hubble
- Edwin Power
- Edwin Thompson Jaynes
- Effect of sun angle on climate
- Effective action
- Effective atomic number (compounds and mixtures)
- Effective diffusion coefficient
- Effective dose (radiation)
- Effective field theory
- Effective input noise temperature
- Effective mass (solid-state physics)
- Effective medium model
- Effective nuclear charge
- Effective potential
- Effective radiated power
- Effects of nuclear explosions
- Effects of nuclear explosions on human health
- Effects of relativity on GPS
- Effervescence
- Efim Fradkin
- Efimov effect
- Efimov state
- Egbert Kankeleit
- Egg drop competition
- Egon Bretscher
- Egon Orowan
- Egon Schweidler
- Ehlers group
- Ehrenfest equations
- Ehrenfest paradox
- Ehrenfest theorem
- Eigenspinor
- Eight-Foot High Speed Tunnel
- Eightfold Way (physics)
- Einasto profile
- Einselection
- Einstein's awards and honors
- Einstein's box
- Einstein's unsuccessful investigations
- Einstein's views on the aether
- Einstein–Maxwell equations
- Einstein@Home
- Einstein (unit)
- Einstein Cross
- Einstein Papers Project
- Einstein Symposium
- Einstein Telescope
- Einstein Tower
- Einstein aether theory
- Einstein field equations
- Einstein manifold
- Einstein notation
- Einstein protocol
- Einstein radius
- Einstein refrigerator
- Einstein relation (kinetic theory)
- Einstein ring
- Einstein solid
- Einstein synchronisation
- Einstein tensor
- Einsteinhaus
- Einstein–Brillouin–Keller method
- Einstein–Cartan theory
- Einstein–Cartan–Evans theory
- Einstein–Hilbert action
- Einstein–Hopf Drag
- Einstein–Infeld–Hoffmann equations
- Einstein–Szilárd letter
- Einzel lens
- Ekman layer
- Ekman number
- Ekman spiral
- Ekman spirals
- Ekman transport
- Ekmel Özbay
- Ekpyrotic universe
- Elastance
- Elastic collision
- Elastic energy
- Elastic modulus
- Elastic potential energy
- Elastic recoil detection
- Elastic scattering
- Elastic wave
- Elastica theory
- Elasticity (physics)
- Elda Emma Anderson
- Electret
- Electric-field integral equation
- Electric-field screening
- Electric Tokamak
- Electric arc
- Electric charge
- Electric current
- Electric dipole moment
- Electric dipole spin resonance
- Electric dipole transition
- Electric discharge
- Electric displacement field
- Electric effective resistance
- Electric field
- Electric field NMR
- Electric field gradient
- Electric flux
- Electric form factor
- Electric generator
- Electric motor
- Electric potential
- Electric potential energy
- Electric power
- Electric shock
- Electric spark
- Electric susceptibility
- Electric torque
- Electric torque (disambiguation)
- Electrical breakdown
- Electrical conductance
- Electrical impedance
- Electrical mobility
- Electrical network
- Electrical phenomena
- Electrical reactance
- Electrical resistivity and conductivity
- Electrical resistivity tomography
- Electricity
- Electro-absorption modulator
- Electro-optic effect
- Electro-optic modulator
- Electro-optics
- Electro-osmosis
- Electrocaloric effect
- Electrocardiography
- Electroceramics
- Electrochemical Society
- Electrochemical gradient
- Electrochemical impedance spectroscopy
- Electrochemical noise
- Electrochemiluminescence
- Electrochromism
- Electrodeionization
- Electrodeless plasma excitation
- Electrodeless plasma thruster
- Electrodynamic suspension
- Electrodynamic tether
- Electrogravitic tensor
- Electrogravitics
- Electrohydrodynamic thruster
- Electrohydrodynamics
- Electrolaser
- Electroluminescence
- Electroluminescent display
- Electrolytic detector
- Electromagnetic absorbers
- Electromagnetic absorption by water
- Electromagnetic brake
- Electromagnetic buoyancy
- Electromagnetic cavity
- Electromagnetic cloak
- Electromagnetic compatibility
- Electromagnetic environment
- Electromagnetic field
- Electromagnetic force
- Electromagnetic four-potential
- Electromagnetic induction
- Electromagnetic interference control
- Electromagnetic mass
- Electromagnetic metamaterials
- Electromagnetic pulse
- Electromagnetic radiation
- Electromagnetic radiation and health
- Electromagnetic reverberation chamber
- Electromagnetic shielding
- Electromagnetic spectroscopy
- Electromagnetic spectrum
- Electromagnetic stress–energy tensor
- Electromagnetic tensor
- Electromagnetic wave equation
- Electromagnetically induced transparency
- Electromagnetics (journal)
- Electromagnetism
- Electromanipulation
- Electromechanical coupling coefficient
- Electromigration
- Electromotive force
- Electron
- Electron-capture dissociation
- Electron-cloud effect
- Electron-longitudinal acoustic phonon interaction
- Electron magnetic resonance
- Electron Microscopy Center
- Electron affinity
- Electron avalanche
- Electron backscatter diffraction
- Electron beam freeform fabrication
- Electron beam ion source
- Electron beam lithography
- Electron beam physical vapor deposition
- Electron beam processing
- Electron beam technology
- Electron binding energy
- Electron bubble
- Electron capture
- Electron cloud
- Electron configuration
- Electron configurations of the elements (data page)
- Electron crystallography
- Electron cyclotron resonance
- Electron density
- Electron diffraction
- Electron electric dipole moment
- Electron excitation
- Electron gun
- Electron hole
- Electron ionization
- Electron magnetic dipole moment
- Electron microprobe
- Electron microscope
- Electron mobility
- Electron mobility (solid-state physics)
- Electron multiplier
- Electron neutrino
- Electron optics
- Electron paramagnetic resonance
- Electron rest mass
- Electron scattering
- Electron shell
- Electron spectrometer
- Electron spin resonance
- Electron spiral toroid
- Electron temperature
- Electron tomography
- Electron wake
- Electroneutral exchange
- Electronic Journal of Theoretical Physics
- Electronic anticoincidence
- Electronic band structure
- Electronic correlation
- Electronic density
- Electronic imager
- Electronic pest control
- Electronic speckle pattern interferometry
- Electronic state
- Electronvolt
- Electron–positron annihilation
- Electroosmotic flow
- Electrophoresis
- Electrorheological fluid
- Electrorotation
- Electroscope
- Electrospray ionization
- Electrostatic deflection
- Electrostatic discharge
- Electrostatic generator
- Electrostatic induction
- Electrostatic ion thruster
- Electrostatic lens
- Electrostatic levitation
- Electrostatics
- Electrostriction
- Electrovacuum solution
- Electrovibration
- Electroweak epoch
- Electroweak interaction
- Electroweak scale
- Electroweak star
- Electroweak symmetry breaking
- Electrowetting
- Eleftheriades, G.V.
- Eleftheriades, George
- Eleftheriades, George V.
- Elektronika (journal)
- Elementary charge
- Elementary particle
- Elements: An International Magazine of Mineralogy, Geochemistry, and Petrology
- Elements of Dynamic
- Elepter Andronikashvili
- Elevator paradox (physics)
- Eli Barkai
- Eli Franklin Burton
- Eli Turkel
- Eli Yablonovitch
- Elitzur–Vaidman bomb tester
- Eliyahu M. Goldratt
- Elizabeth Rauscher
- Elizabeth Rhoades
- Ellery Schempp
- Elliott H. Lieb
- Ellipsometry
- Elliptic orbit
- Elliptical polarization
- Elliptical wing
- Ellis–Karliner angle
- Elsa M. Garmire
- Elwin Bruno Christoffel
- EmDrive
- Emagram
- Emanoil Bacaloglu
- Emanuel Kamber
- Emergence
- Emergency Core Cooling System
- Emerson Cavitation Tunnel
- Emil Bose
- Emil Cohn
- Emil Konopinski
- Emil Martinec
- Emil Rupp
- Emil Warburg
- Emil Wiechert
- Emil Wolf
- Emile Amagat
- Émile Verdet
- Émilie du Châtelet
- Emilio G. Segrè
- Emilio Oribe
- Emilio Zavattini
- Emilios T. Harlaftis
- Emission (electromagnetic radiation)
- Emission coefficient
- Emission spectroscopy
- Emission spectrum
- Emission spectrum (fluorescence spectroscopy)
- Emission theory
- Emissivity
- Emlyn Rhoderick
- Emmanuel Maignan
- Emory Leon Chaffee
- Empedocles
- Empirical formula
- Empty lattice approximation
- Encircled energy
- End correction
- Endel Aruja
- Endergonic
- Endoreversible thermodynamics
- Endothermic
- Ene Ergma
- Energies per unit mass
- Energy
- Energy-dispersive X-ray spectroscopy
- Energy Catalyzer
- Energy Citations Database
- Energy Research Abstracts
- Energy Science and Technology Database
- Energy Technology Data Exchange
- Energy amplifier
- Energy and Environmental Security Initiative
- Energy applications of nanotechnology
- Energy arc
- Energy carrier
- Energy condition
- Energy conversion efficiency
- Energy current
- Energy density
- Energy drift
- Energy eigenstates
- Energy landscape
- Energy level
- Energy level splitting
- Energy medicine
- Energy operator
- Energy recovery linac
- Energy scale
- Energy spectrum
- Energy technologies
- Energy technology
- Energy transformation
- Energy–momentum relation
- Engelbert Broda
- Engelbert Schücking
- Engin Arık
- Engineering Science
- Engineering diffraction
- Engineering physics
- Englert–Greenberger duality relation
- Enhanced Fujita Scale
- Enid MacRobbie
- Ennio Candotti
- Enriched Xenon Observatory
- Enriched uranium
- Enrico Costa (physicist)
- Enrico Fermi
- Enrico Fermi Award
- Enrico Fermi Nuclear Power Plant (Italy)
- Enrico Persico
- Enrique Gaviola
- Enrique Loedel Palumbo
- Enrique Marcatili
- Ensemble (fluid mechanics)
- Ensemble average
- Ensemble interpretation
- Enstrophy
- Enthalpy
- Enthalpy change of solution
- Enthalpy of fusion
- Enthalpy of neutralization
- Enthalpy of sublimation
- Enthalpy of vaporization
- Enthalpy–entropy chart
- Entrainment (hydrodynamics)
- Entrainment (physics)
- Entrance pupil
- Entropic explosion
- Entropic force
- Entropic gravity
- Entropy
- Entropy (arrow of time)
- Entropy (astrophysics)
- Entropy (classical thermodynamics)
- Entropy (energy dispersal)
- Entropy (general concept)
- Entropy (information theory)
- Entropy (journal)
- Entropy (order and disorder)
- Entropy (statistical thermodynamics)
- Entropy and life
- Entropy in thermodynamics and information theory
- Entropy of a probability distribution
- Entropy of fusion
- Entropy of mixing
- Entropy of vaporization
- Environment (systems)
- Environmental Research Letters
- Environmental and Engineering Geophysical Society
- Environmental impact of wind power
- Environmental isotopes
- Environmental magnetism
- Environmental radioactivity
- Environmentalists for Nuclear Energy
- Ephraim Katzir
- Epitaxy
- Epsilon radiation
- Equal-loudness contour
- Equation of State Calculations by Fast Computing Machines
- Equation of state
- Equation of state (cosmology)
- Equation of the center
- Equations for a falling body
- Equations of motion
- Equatorial waves
- Equilibrium mode distribution
- Equilibrium thermodynamics
- Equipartition theorem
- Equipotential
- Equipotential surface
- Equivalence of direct radiation
- Equivalence principle
- Equivalent circuit
- Equivalent dose
- Equivalent dumping coefficient
- Equivalent noise resistance
- Equivalent potential temperature
- Equivalent rectangular bandwidth
- Equivalent temperature
- Er:YAG laser
- Erbium-doped waveguide amplifier
- Erdal İnönü
- Erect image
- Erg
- Ergodic hypothesis
- Ergosphere
- Eric Allin Cornell
- Eric Fawcett
- Eric Isaacs
- Eric Kandel
- Eric Lerner
- Eric M. Rogers
- Eric Mazur
- Eric Poisson
- Eric Van Stryland
- Eric Voice
- Erich Bagge
- Erich Fischer
- Erich Hückel
- Erich Kretschmann
- Erich P. Ippen
- Erich Peter Wohlfarth
- Erich Regener
- Erich Sackmann
- Erich Schumann
- Erich Vogt
- Erich von Drygalski
- Erick Weinberg
- Ericsson cycle
- Eridanus Supervoid
- Erik Edlund
- Erik Verlinde
- Ernest C. Pollard
- Ernest Courant
- Ernest Hanbury Hankin
- Ernest Harry Vestine
- Ernest Howard Griffiths
- Ernest J. Sternglass
- Ernest Lawrence
- Ernest Lester Jones
- Ernest Marsden
- Ernest Rutherford
- Ernest Walton
- Ernest William Titterton
- Ernesto Sabato
- Ernie Tuck
- Ernst Abbe
- Ernst Brüche
- Ernst Chladni
- Ernst Emil Alexander Back
- Ernst G. Bauer
- Ernst Gehrcke
- Ernst Henry Krause
- Ernst Ising
- Ernst Lecher
- Ernst Mach
- Ernst Messerschmid
- Ernst R. G. Eckert
- Ernst Regener
- Ernst Rexer
- Ernst Ruska
- Ernst Stueckelberg
- Ernst Stuhlinger
- Ernst W. Hamburger
- Erwin Fues
- Erwin Hahn
- Erwin Madelung
- Erwin Marquit
- Erwin Saxl
- Erwin Schrödinger
- Erwin Wilhelm Müller
- Escape orbit
- Escape velocity
- Esteban Terradas i Illa
- Esther M. Conwell
- Estia J. Eichten
- Estonian Physical Society
- Eta meson
- Eta prime meson
- Eternal inflation
- Etheric force
- Étienne-Gaspard Robert
- Étienne-Louis Malus
- Ettingshausen effect
- Ettore Majorana
- Etymology of electricity
- Euclidean quantum gravity
- Euclidean vector
- Eudemus of Rhodes
- Eudiometer
- Eugen Brodhun
- Eugen Goldstein
- Eugen Merzbacher
- Eugen von Lommel
- Eugene C. Bingham
- Eugene C. Crittenden
- Eugene Feenberg
- Eugene Guth
- Eugene I. Gordon
- Eugene Levich
- Eugene Mallove
- Eugene McDermott
- Eugene Podkletnov
- Eugene Rabinowitch
- Eugene T. Booth
- Eugene Wigner
- Eugène Cremmer
- Euler's Disk
- Euler's equations (rigid body dynamics)
- Euler's laws of motion
- Euler's three-body problem
- Euler equations (fluid dynamics)
- Euler force
- Euler number (physics)
- Euler–Bernoulli beam theory
- Euler–Heisenberg Lagrangian
- Euler–Lagrange equation
- Euler–Tricomi equation
- Eurisol
- European Biophysics Journal
- European Combined Geodetic Network
- European Geosciences Union
- European Journal of Physics
- European Muon Collaboration
- European Nuclear Society
- European Optical Society
- European Physical Journal
- European Physical Journal A
- European Physical Journal B
- European Physical Journal C
- European Physical Journal D
- European Physical Journal E
- European Physical Journal H
- European Physical Society
- European Spallation Source
- European Synchrotron Radiation Facility
- European Underground Rare Event Calorimeter Array
- European x-ray free electron laser
- Eva Ekeblad
- Eva Nogales
- Eva Silverstein
- Evan Harris Walker
- Evanescent wave
- Evanescent wave coupling
- Evaporative cooler
- Evelyn Hu
- Event (particle physics)
- Event generator
- Event horizon
- Event reconstruction
- Everette Lee DeGolyer
- Evershed effect
- Everything
- Evgeni Gross
- Evgenii Feinberg
- Evgeny Aramovich Abramyan
- Evgeny Lifshitz
- Evgeny Velikhov
- Ewald's sphere
- Ewald Georg von Kleist
- Ewald Wollny
- Ewald construction
- Ewald summation
- Exa Corp.
- Exact solutions in general relativity
- Exact solutions of Einstein's field equations
- Exact solutions of classical central-force problems
- Exchange bias
- Exchange current density
- Exchange force (disambiguation)
- Exchange interaction
- Exchange interactions
- Exchange symmetry
- Excimer laser
- Excitable medium
- Excitation function
- Excitation (magnetic)
- Excitation spectrum
- Excitation temperature
- Excited state
- Exciton
- Exclusion area
- Exclusive correlation spectroscopy
- Exergonic
- Exergy
- Exergy efficiency
- Exoelectron emission
- Exothermic
- Exotic atom
- Exotic baryon
- Exotic hadron
- Exotic matter
- Exotic meson
- Exotic particle
- Exotic star
- Expander cycle (rocket)
- Expansion deflection nozzle
- Expansion of the universe
- Expectation value (quantum mechanics)
- Experimental physics
- Experiments in Fluids
- Experiments of Rayleigh and Brace
- Explicit symmetry breaking
- Exploration geophysics
- Explorer 1
- Exponential dichotomy
- Exposure assessment
- Extended X-ray absorption fine structure
- Extended periodic table
- Extended supersymmetry
- Extensional viscosity
- Exterior covariant derivative
- External ballistics
- External combustion engine
- External flow
- Extinct radionuclide
- Extinction cross
- Extra high tension
- Extragalactic cosmic ray
- Extrasolar planet
- Extremal black hole
- Extreme Light Infrastructure
- Extreme Universe Space Observatory
- Extremely high frequency
- Extremely low frequency
- Eye (cyclone)
- Ezer Griffiths
- Ezra T. Newman
- Eötvös experiment
- Eötvös number
