= EMR =

EMR may refer to:

== Companies ==
- Emerson Electric, an American company with NYSE symbol EMR
- European Metal Recycling, a scrap metal recycling company
- East Midlands Railway, a British train operating company
  - EMR Regional railway route
- EMR Telemetry, an American technology company
- Eastern Maine Railway, an American short line railroad.

== Science and technology ==
- Electromagnetic radiation, a self-propagating wave in space
- Electron magnetic resonance, several forms of imaging methods
- Electro Magnetic Resonance, a Wacom technology
- Extraordinary magnetoresistance, a geometrical magnetoresistance effect

=== Medicine ===
- EGF module-containing mucin-like hormone receptor
- Electronic medical record, a medical record in digital format
- Emergency medical responder, a level of medical training below that of an emergency medical technician
- Endoscopic mucosal resection, a medical therapy with endoscopy

== Other uses ==
- Amazon Elastic MapReduce, an Amazon EC2 service based on Hadoop
- Edmonton Metropolitan Region, a metropolitan area in Alberta, Canada
- EMR camouflage, Russian digital military camouflage pattern
- Excalibur: Morgana's Revenge, a 1997 computer game
- M39 Enhanced Marksman Rifle, an American sniper rifle
