= Cantuar =

Cantuar is an abbreviation of the Latin term Cantuariensis, meaning of Canterbury. It may refer to:

- Canterbury, a cathedral city which is part of the City of Canterbury, a local government district in Kent, England
- Cantuar, Saskatchewan, a ghost town in Canada
- City of Canterbury, a local government district in Kent, England
- See of Canterbury, an Anglican archiepiscopal see, the Latin abbreviation of whose name is typically used in the archbishop's signature
- Lambeth degrees, awarded by the Archbishop of Canterbury, are shown by the abbreviation Cantuar in post-nominal letters
- University of Canterbury, a New Zealand university which uses Cantuar or Cant as an abbreviation for its name in post-nominal letters
- University of Kent, an English university which uses Cantuar as an abbreviation for its name in post-nominal letters

== See also ==
- Ebor (disambiguation)
