= Melissa Dancy =

American physics education researcher

- Education: Furman University (BS), 1992; Purdue University (MS) 1994, (MS) 1996; North Carolina State University (PhD) 2000
- Scientific career
- Fields: Physics education
- Thesis: Investigating animations for assessment with an animated version of the Force Concept Inventory (2000)
- Doctoral advisor: Robert J. Beichner

Melissa Dancy is an American physics education researcher and associate professor at North Carolina State University.

In 2025, she was elected as a fellow of the American Physical Society.

== Education ==
Dancy completed her undergraduate studies in Physics at Furman University. She was awarded a Bachelor of Science in 1992. She then attended Purdue University where she earned two Master of Science degrees, the first in Physics in 1994 and the second in Science Education in 1996. She was awarded a Doctor of Philosophy from North Carolina State University (NCSU) in 2000 in Physics Education Research.

== Career ==
Dancy joined Davidson College as a visiting assistant professor in 2002. While there, she contributed to the Physlet project. In 2003, she joined Western Carolina University as an assistant professor of Chemistry and Physics. She then was faculty at University of North Carolina at Charlotte and Johnson C. Smith University. She joined University of Colorado Boulder as a research professor in 2010.

In August 2025, she joined NCSU as an associate professor.

=== Research ===
While working as an independent consultant affiliated with Western Michigan University, Dancy was a co-investigator of a US$300,000 grant awarded by the National Science Foundation in 2017 to investigate why white, male physicists fail to mitigate sexism and racism in science, technology, engineering, and mathematics. Out of the funding, The College Fix noted only one study was produced with a sample size of 27.

The study, "How well-intentioned white male physicists maintain ignorance of inequity and justify inaction", was pre-published on ArXiv in 2022 and published in the in 2023. The study was conducted by Dancy and co-investigator Apriel Hodari, found that among a group of progressive white male physicists there are pervasive patterns of discourse that allow those individuals to maintain their identity as “good” or “equity-minded” while remaining largely inactive in confronting racism and sexism in physics. Patterns identified include distancing oneself from the problem, attributing causes to distant systems, and justifying inaction on grounds of ignorance, discomfort, or lack of agency. Astrobites noted that the interview-based approach provides insight into how privileged physicists talk about inequity but is constrained by its small, self-selected sample of volunteers who already identified as “progressive,” limiting its applicability across the broader physics community. Science reported that the study was representative of white privilege in the field, and a widespread lack of awareness about how privilege shapes attitudes and behavior in the field.

== Awards and honors ==
- Outstanding Referee, American Physical Society, 2022
- Fellow, American Physical Society, 2025

== Selected publications ==
- Dancy, Melissa; Henderson, Charles (2010-10-01). "Pedagogical practices and instructional change of physics faculty". American Journal of Physics. 78 (10): 1056–1063. Bibcode:2010AmJPh..78.1056D. doi:10.1119/1.3446763. ISSN 0002-9505.
- Dancy, Melissa; Henderson, Charles; Turpen, Chandra (2016-02-22). "How faculty learn about and implement research-based instructional strategies: The case of Peer Instruction". Physical Review Physics Education Research. 12 (1) 010110. Bibcode:2016PRPER..12a0110D. doi:10.1103/PhysRevPhysEducRes.12.010110. ISSN 2469-9896.
- Rainey, Katherine; Dancy, Melissa; Mickelson, Roslyn; Stearns, Elizabeth; Moller, Stephanie (2018). "Race and gender differences in how sense of belonging influences decisions to major in STEM". International Journal of STEM Education. 5 (1) 10. doi:10.1186/s40594-018-0115-6. ISSN 2196-7822. PMC 6310405. PMID 30631700.
- Henderson, Charles; Dancy, Melissa H. (2009-12-11). "Impact of physics education research on the teaching of introductory quantitative physics in the United States". Physical Review Special Topics - Physics Education Research. 5 (2) 020107. Bibcode:2009PRPER...5b0107H. doi:10.1103/PhysRevSTPER.5.020107. ISSN 1554-9178.
- Dancy, Melissa (2025-04-25). "Fairness is Still Missing in Physics Departments". Physics. 18 87. Bibcode:2025PhyOJ..18...87D. doi:10.1103/Physics.18.87. ISSN 1943-2879.
