= High impedance surface =

Artificial surfaces that emulate perfect magnetic conductors

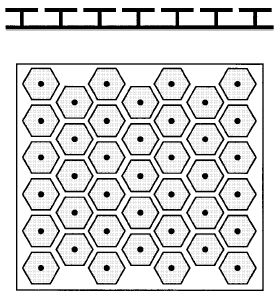
Original high-impedance electromagnetic surface design, proposed by Sievenpiper et al. in 1999

A high impedance surface (HIS), also known as an artificial magnetic conductor (AMC), is an electromagnetic metasurface that emulates the properties of a perfect magnetic conductor within a specific frequency band. While conventional flat metal sheets, widely used in antenna systems, act as perfect electric conductors and reflect electromagnetic waves with a 180° degree phase shift, these surfaces cause no phase reversal in the reflected wave within their frequency band of operation, suppressing the conduction of alternating currents and propagation of surface waves.

While the artificial magnetic conductors were studied as early as 1993, the best-known HIS design was introduced in 1999 by Dan Sievenpiper in the form of hexagonal metallic patches placed on a grounded dielectric substrate and connected to the ground with metallic vias. This particular design is also known as mushroom-type and Sievenpiper high-impedance surfaces. Alternative designs without vias were also reported in the literature. Impedance of a HIS is often modeled as a LC circuit; more detailed electromagnetic modeling approaches based on impedance boundary conditions are also used.

Applications of HIS include electromagnetic reflectors, antennas with reduced mutual coupling, electromagnetic absorbers and gap waveguide technology.

== See also ==
- Artificial dielectrics
- Metamaterial
- Patch antenna
- Photonic crystal
- Tunable metamaterial
