= Ebor =

Ebor is the abbreviation of the Latin Eboracum, an early Latin form for York in Britain. It may also mean:

== Horse racing ==
- Ebor (horse), a British Thoroughbred racehorse
- Ebor Handicap, a horse race run at York Racecourse in August
  - Ebor Festival, the four-day race meeting at which the race is run

== People and titles ==
- Ebor, the legal alias of the Archbishops of York
- Ebor, a post-nominal used after the degree letters to indicate that it was awarded by the University of York

== Places ==
- Ebor, Manitoba, a community in Canada
- Ebor, New South Wales, a village in Australia
- Ebor Falls, waterfalls in New South Wales, Australia
- Ebor Way, a footpath in Yorkshire, England

== Other uses ==
- EBOR, Experimental Beryllium Oxide Reactor, a nuclear reactor at the Idaho National Laboratory, U.S.
- Ebor Inn, a listed public house in North Yorkshire, England
