= Electromagnetic absorbers =

Electromagnetic absorbers are specifically chosen or designed materials that can inhibit the reflection or transmission of electromagnetic radiation. For example, this can be accomplished with materials such as dielectrics combined with metal plates spaced at prescribed intervals or wavelengths. The particular absorption frequencies, thickness, component arrangement and configuration of the materials also determine capabilities and uses. In addition, researchers are studying advanced materials such as metamaterials in hopes of improved performance and diversity of applications. Some intended applications for the new absorbers include emitters, sensors, spatial light modulators, infrared camouflage, wireless communication, and use in thermophotovoltaics.

Generally, there are two types of absorbers: resonant absorbers and broadband absorbers. The resonant absorbers are frequency-dependent because of the desired resonance of the material at a particular wavelength. Different types of resonant absorbers are the Salisbury screen, the Jaumann absorber, the Dallenbach layer, crossed grating absorbers, and circuit analog (CA) absorbers.

Broadband absorbers are independent of a particular frequency and can therefore be effective across a broad spectrum.
