= Active vibration control =

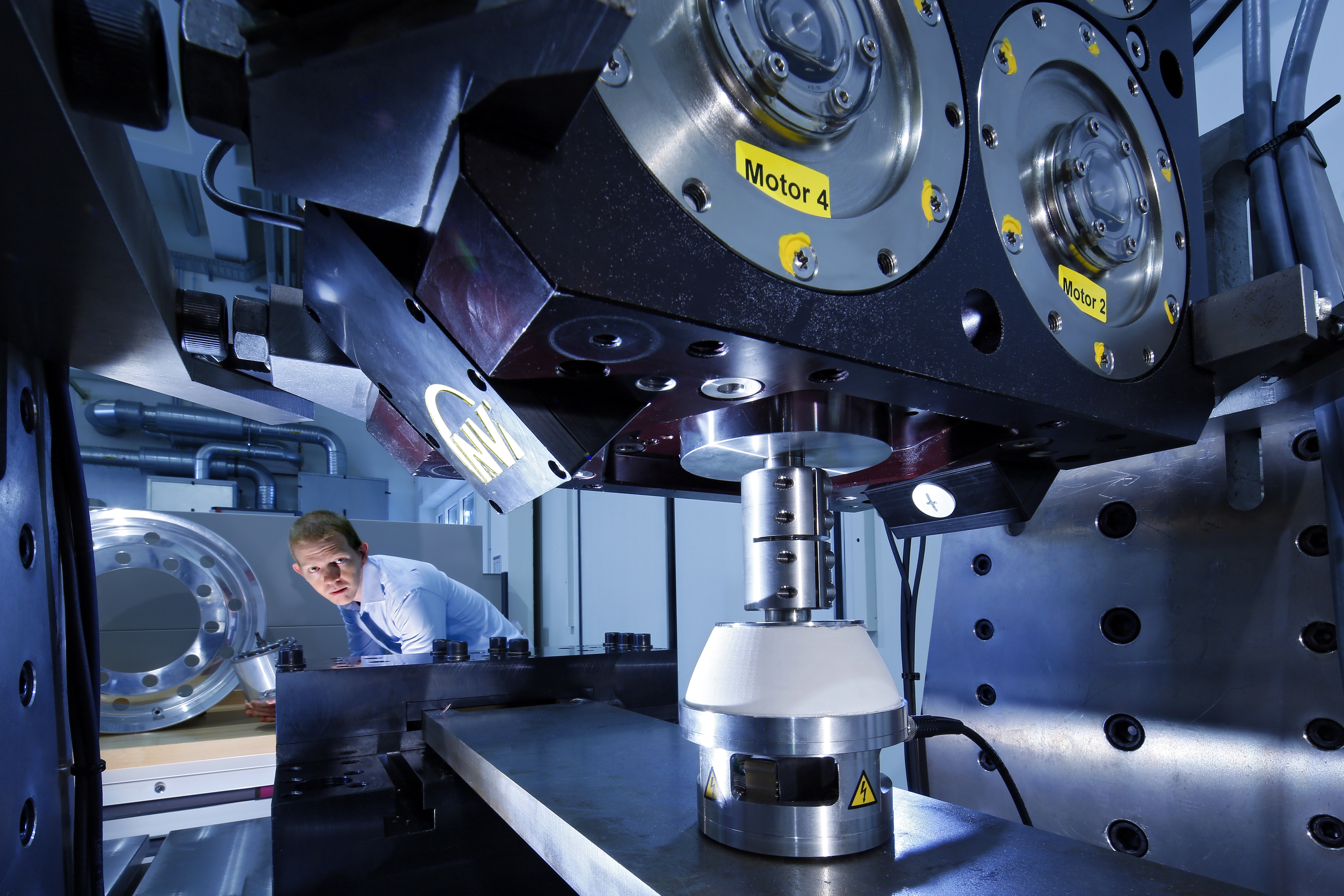
Test bench for active vibration control at the Fraunhofer Institute LBF. A piezo driven active engine mount cancels the vibration resulting from several motors on top of the Mount by inducing countervibrations.

Active vibration control is the active application of force in an equal and opposite fashion to the forces imposed by external vibration. With this application, a precision industrial process can be maintained on a platform essentially vibration-free.

Many precision industrial processes cannot take place if the machinery is being affected by vibration. For example, the production of semiconductor wafers requires that the machines used for the photolithography steps be used in an essentially vibration-free environment or the sub-micrometre features will be blurred. Active vibration control is now also commercially available for reducing vibration in helicopters, offering better comfort with less weight than traditional passive technologies.

In the past, passive techniques were used. These include traditional vibration dampers, shock absorbers, and base isolation.

The typical active vibration control system uses several components:

- A massive platform suspended by several active drivers (that may use voice coils, hydraulics, pneumatics, piezo-electric or other techniques)
- Three accelerometers that measure acceleration in the three degrees of freedom
- An electronic amplifier system that amplifies and inverts the signals from the accelerometers. A PID controller can be used to get better performance than a simple inverting amplifier.
- For very large systems, pneumatic or hydraulic components that provide the high drive power required.

If the vibration is periodic, then the control system may adapt to the ongoing vibration, thereby providing better cancellation than would have been provided simply by reacting to each new acceleration without referring to past accelerations.

Active vibration control has been successfully implemented for vibration attenuation of beam, plate and shell structures by numerous researchers. For effective active vibration control, the structure should be smart enough to sense external disturbances and react accordingly. In order to develop an active structure (also known as smart structure), smart materials must be integrated or embedded with the structure. The smart structure involves sensors (strain, acceleration, velocity, force etc.), actuators (force, inertial, strain etc.) and a control algorithm (feedback or feed forward). The number of smart materials have been investigated and fabricated over the years; some of them are shape memory alloys, piezoelectric materials, optical fibers, electro-rheological fluids, magneto-strictive materials.

== See also ==
- Active noise control
- Active vibration isolation
- Magnetorheological fluid
- Noise-cancelling headphones
