= Exa Corporation =

- Company type: Public
- Traded as: Nasdaq: EXA
- Industry: Computer-aided engineering
- Founded: November 21, 1991; 34 years ago
- Founder: Kim Molvig
- Fate: Acquired by Dassault Systèmes
- Headquarters: United States
- Products: PowerFLOW; PowerTHERM; PowerCOOL; PowerACOUSTICS; PowerCASE; PowerDELTA; PowerVIZ; PowerINSIGHT; PowerREALITY; ExaCLOUD
- Website: exa.com

Exa Corporation was a developer and distributor of computer-aided engineering (CAE) software. Its main product was PowerFLOW, a lattice-boltzmann derived implementation of computational fluid dynamics (CFD), which can very accurately simulate internal and external flows in low-Mach regimes. PowerFLOW is used extensively in the international automotive and transportation industries.

On November 17, 2017, Dassault Systèmes completed acquisition of Exa Corporation. Exa became part of Dassault's SIMULIA brand.

== History ==
Exa was founded in November, 1991 in Lexington, Massachusetts. Exa raised about $2.4 million in a series of venture capital investments from April 1993 though 1994 from Fidelity Ventures and individuals. More funding was obtained in 1994, 1996, 1998 and 2005, including Boston Capital Ventures as an investor. In 1999, Stephen A. Remondi became chief executive.

The company filed for an initial public offering in June 2012. On September 28, 2017, Dassault Systèmes announced the signing of a definitive merger agreement to acquire Exa, valuing the company at about 400 million USD.

For fiscal year 2012, Exa recorded total revenues, net income and Adjusted EBITDA of $45.9 million, $14.5 million and $7.1 million, respectively. Since generating its first commercial revenue in 1994, Exa's annual revenue had increased for 18 consecutive years. The company was profitable in fiscal years 2011 and 2012 after recording net losses in the three preceding fiscal years. Exa's total revenues and Adjusted EBITDA in fiscal year 2012 increased 21% and 51%, respectively, compared with fiscal year 2011. Exa reported $61.4 million in total revenue for the full year fiscal 2015. The company's total revenue was expected to be in the range of $64.7 million to $67.0 million for the full year fiscal 2016.

The Exa corporate headquarters were located in Burlington, Massachusetts. The company also had U.S. offices in Livonia, Michigan, and Brisbane, California, along with offices in Europe and Asia. Exa's European headquarters were located in Paris, France, and it also had European offices in Germany, Italy and the United Kingdom. Exa's Asia headquarters were located in Japan, and its Asia offices were based out of China, India and South Korea. Exa employed over 350 people worldwide.
