= Winfield Salisbury =

American scientist

- Born: December 23, 1903; Iowa, U.S.
- Died: October 16, 1999 (aged 95); Maricopa, Arizona, U.S.
- Education: Texas A&M College; University of Iowa (BA); University of California, Berkeley (DSc)
- Occupation: Scientist

Winfield Salisbury (December 23, 1903 – October 16, 1999) was an American scientist and inventor. He is most notable for having invented the Salisbury screen.

== Biography ==
He was born on 23 December 1903 in Iowa, United States to Herbert Spencer Salisbury and Leona Scott Salisbury.

He was married to Elma Salisbury and had three children.

He died on 16 October 1999 in Maricopa, Arizona, United States.

== Education ==
He attended Texas A & M College. He completed his B.A. at the University of Iowa in 1926. He completed his D.Sc. at the University of California (Berkeley) in 1950.

== Career ==
In 1952, he became the Mackay Professor of Electrical Engineering at the University of California Berkeley.

== Bibliography ==
His publications include:

1936 Observations on Capacitive Character of Human Body in Electrocardiograph Circuits, M. Papers, Christian Birthday Volume, pp 76–86, 1936, New York. (with H. Rosenblum.)

1939 An Improved Magnetostriction Oscillator, Review of Scientific Instruments, Vol. 10, p 142, April, 1939, New York (with C. W. Porter.)

An Efficient Piezo-Electric Oscillator, Review of Scientific Instruments, Vol. 10, p 269, September, 1939, New York. (with C. W. Porter.)

Initial Performance of the 60-inch Cyclotron of the Wm. N. Crocker Radiation Laboratory, University of California, Physical Review, Vol. 56, p 124, July to 'December, 1939, New York. (with E. O. Lawrence and others.)

Modified Arc Source for the Cyclotron, Physical Review, Vol. 56, p 836, October, 1939, New York. (with E.M. McMillan.)

1946 The Resnatron, Electronics, Vol. 19, pp 92–97, February,

1946, New York. High Power Tubes for VHF Operation, Communications, Vol. 26, no. 6, p 33, June, 1946, New York.
