= Standard enthalpy of reaction =

Enthalpy difference due to chemical reaction, reduced to standard states

The standard enthalpy of reaction (denoted $\Delta H_{\text {reaction}}^\ominus$) for a chemical reaction is the difference between total product and total reactant molar enthalpies, calculated for substances in their standard states. The value can be approximately interpreted in terms of the total of the chemical bond energies for bonds broken and bonds formed.

For a generic chemical reaction

$$\nu_{\text {A}} \text {A} + \nu_{\,\text {B}} \text {B} ~+ ~... \rightarrow  \nu_{\,\text {X}} \text {X} + \nu_{\text {Y}} \text {Y} ~+ ~...$$

the standard enthalpy of reaction $\Delta H_{\text {reaction}}^\ominus$ is related to the standard enthalpy of formation $\Delta_{\text {f}} H^\ominus$ values of the reactants and products by the following equation:

$$\Delta H_{\text {reaction}}^\ominus = \sum_{\text{products},~p} \nu_p\Delta_{\text {f}} H_{p}^{\ominus} - \sum_{\text{reactants},~r} \nu_r\Delta_{\text {f}} H_{r}^{\ominus}$$

In this equation, $\nu_i$ are the stoichiometric coefficients of each product and reactant. The standard enthalpy of formation, which has been determined for a vast number of substances, is the change of enthalpy during the formation of 1 mole of the substance from its constituent elements, with all substances in their standard states.

Standard states can be defined at any temperature and pressure, so both the standard temperature and pressure must always be specified. Most values of standard thermochemical data are tabulated at either (25°C, 1 bar) or (25°C, 1 atm).

For ions in aqueous solution, the standard state is often chosen such that the aqueous H^{+} ion at a concentration of exactly 1 mole/liter has a standard enthalpy of formation equal to zero, which makes possible the tabulation of standard enthalpies for cations and anions at the same standard concentration. This convention is consistent with the use of the standard hydrogen electrode in the field of electrochemistry. However, there are other common choices in certain fields, including a standard concentration for H^{+} of exactly 1 mole/(kg solvent) (widely used in chemical engineering) and $10^{-7}$ mole/L (used in the field of biochemistry).

== Introduction ==
Two initial thermodynamic systems, each isolated in their separate states of internal thermodynamic equilibrium, can, by a thermodynamic operation, be coalesced into a single new final isolated thermodynamic system. If the initial systems differ in chemical constitution, then the eventual thermodynamic equilibrium of the final system can be the result of chemical reaction. Alternatively, an isolated thermodynamic system, in the absence of some catalyst, can be in a metastable equilibrium; introduction of a catalyst, or some other thermodynamic operation, such as release of a spark, can trigger a chemical reaction. The chemical reaction will, in general, transform some chemical potential energy into thermal energy. If the joint system is kept isolated, then its internal energy remains unchanged. Such thermal energy manifests itself, however, in changes in the non-chemical state variables (such as temperature, pressure, volume) of the joint systems, as well as the changes in the mole numbers of the chemical constituents that describe the chemical reaction.

Internal energy is defined with respect to some standard state. Subject to suitable thermodynamic operations, the chemical constituents of the final system can be brought to their respective standard states, along with transfer of energy as heat or through thermodynamic work, which can be measured or calculated from measurements of non-chemical state variables. Accordingly, the calculation of standard enthalpy of reaction is the most established way of quantifying the conversion of chemical potential energy into thermal energy.

== Enthalpy of reaction for standard conditions defined and measured ==
The standard enthalpy of a reaction is defined so as to depend simply upon the standard conditions that are specified for it, not simply on the conditions under which the reactions actually occur. There are two general conditions under which thermochemical measurements are actually made.

(a) Constant volume and temperature: heat $Q_V = \Delta U$, where $U$ (sometimes written as $E$) is the internal energy of the system
(b) Constant pressure and temperature: heat $Q_P = \Delta H$, where $H = U + PV$ is the enthalpy of the system

The magnitudes of the heat effects in these two conditions are different. In the first case the volume of the system is kept constant during the course of the measurement by carrying out the reaction in a closed and rigid container, and as there is no change in the volume no work is involved. From the first law of thermodynamics, $\Delta U = Q - W$, where W is the work done by the system. When only expansion work is possible for a process we have $\Delta U = Q_V$; this implies that the heat of reaction at constant volume is equal to the change in the internal energy $\Delta U$ of the reacting system.

The thermal change that occurs in a chemical reaction is only due to the difference between the sum of internal energy of the products and the sum of the internal energy of reactants. We have

$$\Delta U = \sum U_\text{products} - \sum U_\text{reactants}$$

This also signifies that the amount of heat absorbed at constant volume could be identified with the change in the thermodynamic quantity internal energy.

At constant pressure on the other hand, the system is either kept open to the atmosphere or confined within a container on which a constant external pressure is exerted and under these conditions the volume of the system changes. The thermal change at a constant pressure not only involves the change in the internal energy of the system but also the work performed either in expansion or contraction of the system. In general the first law requires that

$Q = \Delta U + W$ (work)

If $W$ is only pressure–volume work, then at constant pressure

$$Q_P = \Delta U + P \Delta V$$

Assuming that the change in state variables is due solely to a chemical reaction, we have

$$Q_P = \sum U_\text{products} - \sum U_\text{reactants} + P \left(\sum V_\text{products} - \sum V_\text{reactants}\right)$$

$$Q_P =  \sum \left(U_\text{products} + P V_\text{products} \right) - \sum \left(U_\text{reactants} + P V_\text{reactants} \right)$$

As enthalpy or heat content is defined by $H = U + PV$, we have

$$Q_P = \sum H_\text{products} - \sum H_\text{reactants} = \Delta H$$

By convention, the enthalpy of each element in its standard state is assigned a value of zero. If pure preparations of compounds or ions are not possible, then special further conventions are defined. Regardless, if each reactant and product can be prepared in its respective standard state, then the contribution of each species is equal to its molar enthalpy of formation multiplied by its stoichiometric coefficient in the reaction, and the enthalpy of reaction at constant (standard) pressure $P^{\ominus}$ and constant temperature (usually 298 K) may be written as

$$Q_{P^{\ominus}} = \Delta_{\text {rxn}} H^\ominus = \sum_{\text{products},~p} \nu_{p}\Delta_{\text {f}} H_{p}^{\ominus} - \sum_{\text{reactants},~r} \nu_{r}\Delta_{\text {f}} H_{r}^{\ominus}$$

As shown above, at constant pressure the heat of the reaction is exactly equal to the enthalpy change, $\Delta_{\text {rxn}} H$, of the reacting system.

== Variation with temperature or pressure ==
The variation of the enthalpy of reaction with temperature is given by Kirchhoff's Law of Thermochemistry, which states that the temperature derivative of ΔH for a chemical reaction is given by the difference in heat capacity (at constant pressure) between products and reactants:

$$\left(\frac{\partial \Delta H}{\partial T}\right)_p = \Delta C_p$$.

Integration of this equation permits the evaluation of the heat of reaction at one temperature from measurements at another temperature.

$$\Delta H^\circ \! \left( T \right) = \Delta H^\circ \! \left( T^\circ \right) + \int_{T^\circ}^{T} \Delta C_P^\circ \, \mathrm{d} T$$

Pressure variation effects and corrections due to mixing are generally minimal unless a reaction involves non-ideal gases and/or solutes, or is carried out at extremely high pressures. The enthalpy of mixing for a solution of ideal gases is exactly zero; the same is true for a reaction where the reactants and products are pure, unmixed components. Contributions to reaction enthalpies due to concentration variations for solutes in solution generally must be experimentally determined on a case by case basis, but would be exactly zero for ideal solutions since no change in the solution's average intermolecular forces as a function of concentration is possible in an ideal solution.

== Subcategories ==
In each case the word standard implies that all reactants and products are in their standard states.

- Standard enthalpy of combustion is the enthalpy change when one mole of an organic compound reacts with molecular oxygen (O_{2}) to form carbon dioxide and liquid water. For example, the standard enthalpy of combustion of ethane gas refers to the reaction C_{2}H_{6} (g) + 7/2 O_{2} (g) → 2 CO_{2} (g) + 3 H_{2}O (l).
- Standard enthalpy of formation is the enthalpy change when one mole of any compound is formed from its constituent elements in their standard states. The enthalpy of formation of one mole of ethane gas refers to the reaction 2 C (graphite) + 3 H_{2} (g) → C_{2}H_{6} (g).
- Standard enthalpy of hydrogenation is defined as the enthalpy change observed when one mole of an unsaturated compound reacts with an excess of hydrogen to become fully saturated. The hydrogenation of one mole of acetylene yields ethane as a product and is described by the equation C_{2}H_{2} (g) + 2 H_{2} (g) → C_{2}H_{6} (g).
- Standard enthalpy of neutralization is the change in enthalpy that occurs when an acid and base undergo a neutralization reaction to form one mole of water. For example in aqueous solution, the standard enthalpy of neutralization of hydrochloric acid and the base magnesium hydroxide refers to the reaction HCl (aq) + 1/2 Mg(OH)_{2} → 1/2 MgCl_{2} (aq) + H_{2}O(l).

== Evaluation of reaction enthalpies ==
There are several methods of determining the values of reaction enthalpies, involving either measurements on the reaction of interest or calculations from data for related reactions.

For reactions which go rapidly to completion, it is often possible to measure the heat of reaction directly using a calorimeter. One large class of reactions for which such measurements are common is the combustion of organic compounds by reaction with molecular oxygen (O_{2}) to form carbon dioxide and water (H_{2}O). The heat of combustion can be measured with a so-called bomb calorimeter, in which the heat released by combustion at high temperature is lost to the surroundings as the system returns to its initial temperature. Since enthalpy is a state function, its value is the same for any path between given initial and final states, so that the measured ΔH is the same as if the temperature stayed constant during the combustion.

For reactions which are incomplete, the equilibrium constant can be determined as a function of temperature. The enthalpy of reaction is then found from the van 't Hoff equation as $\Delta_{\text {rxn}} H^\ominus = {RT^2}\frac{d}{dT} \ln K_\mathrm{eq}$. A closely related technique is the use of an electroanalytical voltaic cell, which can be used to measure the Gibbs energy for certain reactions as a function of temperature, yielding $K_\mathrm{eq}(T)$ and thereby $\Delta_{\text {rxn}} H^\ominus$.

It is also possible to evaluate the enthalpy of one reaction from the enthalpies of a number of other reactions whose sum is the reaction of interest, and these not need be formation reactions. This method is based on Hess's law, which states that the enthalpy change is the same for a chemical reaction which occurs as a single reaction or in several steps. If the enthalpies for each step can be measured, then their sum gives the enthalpy of the overall single reaction.

Finally the reaction enthalpy may be estimated using bond energies for the bonds which are broken and formed in the reaction of interest. This method is only approximate, however, because a reported bond energy is only an average value for different molecules with bonds between the same elements.
