= Open Source Physics =

American open source software collection

Open Source Physics, or OSP, is a project sponsored by the National Science Foundation and Davidson College, whose mission is to spread the use of open source code libraries that take care of a lot of the heavy lifting for physics: drawing and plotting, differential equation solvers, exporting to animated GIFs and movies, etc., tools, and compiled simulations for physics and other numerical simulations . The OSP collection provides curriculum resources that engage students in physics, computation, and computer modeling. The core library is in the Java programming language and licensed with GNU General Public License (GNU GPL or simply GPL) licenses. The site now serves over 10,000 visitors per month. The Open Source Physics Project is an extension of the Physlet Project.

== Sub-projects ==
They have four projects with this purpose.

- OSP libraries: Java code libraries for numerical simulations. The OSP code library was created to meet the need by the broader science education community for a synthesis of curriculum development, computational physics, computer science, and physics education that will be useful for scientists and students wishing to write their own simulations and develop their own curricular material. OSP code library is described in the OSP User's Guide by Wolfgang Christian in An Introduction to Computer Simulation Methods by Harvey Gould, Jan Tobochnik, and Wolfgang Christian.
- Easy Java Simulations (EJS) (New name: Easy JavaScript Simulations = EJSS): A free and open source computer-based modeling environment used to generate automatically Java and JavaScript code. Easy JavaScript Simulations is an authoring and modeling tool that allows users to create Java or JavaScript programs with minimal programming. EjsS creates programs that other people can easily inspect or modify.
- Tracker: An open-source software video analysis and modeling tool designed for use in physics education and distributed under the GNU General Public License. In the context of physics education, video analysis means tracking the motions of objects in videos to obtain their 2-D position-time data and associated physical quantities such as velocity, acceleration, momentum and energy. Computerized video analysis has been used widely in physics education since the 1990s. By contrast, video modeling involves defining a theoretical model and drawing it as an animation directly on a video and was introduced only in 2009. Tracker has a built-in dynamic model builder to define particles that move according to Newton's laws. External models built with spreadsheets, Easy Java Simulations or other modeling program can also be used. Tracker also has a line profile tool for measuring light spectra and other optical phenomena. Tracker 1.0 was distributed on disc at the 2003 Summer Meeting of the American Association of Physics Teachers. The current version, 6.0, was released in 2021.
- OSP Curricular Development: A set of programs, packages, and worksheets for the teaching of advanced physics topics. Many instructors do not teach (or do research in) computational physics. For these instructors they have made the various physical models available in an easily accessible, modifiable, and distributable form for teaching of physics. For convenience, OSP programs are almost always packaged in Java archive (jar) files. These jar files contain compiled code and resources such curricular materials, images, and data files.

== Awards ==
In 2011, the project received an important award, the Science Prize for Online Resources in Education, or SPORE from Science magazine In 2015, the project received the UNESCO King Hamad Bin Isa Al-Khalifa Prize for the Use of ICTs in Education and Excellence Award Multimedia Physics Teaching and Learning Conference MPTL20 In 2020, the project received the Excellence in Physics Education Award from the American Physical Society
