= Electric torque (disambiguation) =

Electric torque may refer to:

- Electric torque, responsible for heating water in microwave ovens
- The rotational force acting against electric dipole placed in an electric field
- The mechanical torque of the electrical motor

== See also ==
- Torque wrench
