= Einstein's unsuccessful investigations =

Investigations by Albert Einstein

Albert Einstein conducted several unsuccessful investigations. These pertain to quantum mechanics, superconductivity, and his details on his own theory of relativity. Notable mistakes attributed to Einstein include his challenges to accept certain topics related to quantum mechanics, and the dismissal of the cosmological constant and gravitational waves.

== Special relativity ==
=== Transverse mass ===
In one of his three annus mirabilis papers of 1905, on special relativity, Albert Einstein noted that, given a specific definition of the word "force" (a definition which he later agreed was not advantageous), and if we choose to maintain (by convention) Newton's second law of motion F = ma (mass times acceleration equals force), then one arrives at $\scriptstyle m/(1 - v^2/c^2)$ as the expression for the transverse mass of a fast moving particle. This differs from the accepted expression today, because, as noted in the footnotes to Einstein's paper added in the 1913 reprint, "it is more to the point to define force in such a way that the laws of energy and momentum assume the simplest form", as was done, for example, by Max Planck in 1906, who gave the now familiar expression $\scriptstyle m/\sqrt{1 - v^2/c^2}$ for the transverse mass.

As historian Arthur I. Miller points out, this is equivalent to the transverse mass predictions of both Einstein and Hendrik Lorentz. Einstein had commented already in the 1905 paper that "With a different definition of force and acceleration, we should naturally obtain other expressions for the masses. This shows that in comparing different theories... we must proceed very cautiously."

Physicist Walter Kaufmann was one of the earliest to be interested in Einstein's paper and noticed the error. He noticed the mistake when he compared it with Lorentz theory. Max Planck also pointed out the mistake and rederived the expression. Einstein later used Planck's derivation without giving him credit.

=== Mass-energy equivalence ===
Einstein produced several proofs of his mass–energy equivalence $E=mc^2$, many had mistakes.

=== Spacetime ===
Einstein did not initially appreciate the value of Hermann Minkowski's four-dimensional formulation of spacetime, calling it "superfluous erudition".

=== Equator–pole experiment ===
In his 1905 special relativity paper, Einstein proposed an experiment to test special relativity. He considered that two clocks, one at the Earth's equator and one at one of Earth's poles. He predicted that the clocks would tick at different rates due to time dilation. According to Einstein (in English):

Thence we conclude that a balance clock at the equator must go more slowly, by a very small amount, than a precisely similar clock situated at one of the poles under otherwise identical circumstances.

However this prediction is erroneous when gravity is taken into account as gravitational time dilation cancels this difference. Einstein never corrected this mistake even after the full derivation of general relativity in 1916.

In 1913, mathematician Otto Blumenthal, in collaboration with Arnold Sommerfeld, published an anthology of Einstein's papers with footnotes. For the equator–pole experiment, the footnote read:

Not a pendulum clock which is physically a system to which the earth belongs. This case had to be excluded.

which is not correct and does not solve the issue. History professor Arthur I. Miller attributed the footnote to Sommerfeld, while Ian McCausland attributed it to Einstein himself.

== General relativity and cosmology ==
=== Black holes ===
Einstein considered at various times that the singularity in a black hole, as described by Schwarzschild metric, was a problem. As early as 1918, Felix Klein had found a similar problem in the coordinates of Einstein–de Sitter universe, but Einstein dismissed the idea.

In 1922, when asked by Jacques Hadamard about Schwarszchild solution, Einstein responded that it would represent “an unimaginable misfortune [malheur] for theory…” and called it the “Hadamard catastrophe.” In 1926, in correspondence with philosopher of science, Hans Reichenbach, Einstein dismissed geometric reparametrizations as “a kind of novice aid [Eselsbrücke = ‘donkey bridge’].”

When Georges Lemaître showed that the pathology could be removed by a change of coordinates in 1933, Einstein was not convinced. In his paper with Nathan Rosen about what was later called Einstein–Rosen metric or wormholes, Einstein writes about the Schwarzschild solution saying "For a singularity brings so much arbitrariness into the theory that it actually nullifies its laws."

In 1939, Einstein published a paper that argues that a star collapsing would spin faster and faster, spinning at the speed of light with infinite energy well before the point where it is about to collapse into a Schwarzchild singularity, or black hole, saying

The essential result of this investigation is a clear understanding as to why the "Schwarzschild singularities" do not exist in physical reality. Although the theory given here treats only clusters whose particles move along circular paths it does not seem to be subject to reasonable doubt that more general cases will have analogous results. The "Schwarzschild singularity" does not appear for the reason that matter cannot cannot be concentrated arbitrarily. And this is due to the fact that otherwise the constituting particles would reach the velocity of light.

Einstein proposed that conservation of angular momentum would cause particles in a collapsing body to settle into stable orbits with finite radii, thereby preventing the formation of an event horizon.

In modern theory, the singularity issue is resolved by using Kruskal–Szekeres coordinates. In the early 21st century, the first photo of a black hole was taken by the Event Horizon Telescope and evidence of black hole coalescence has been obtained by LIGO.

=== Cosmological constant ===
In 1916, Einstein met with Willem de Sitter in Netherlands to work on cosmological models. They came up with the ideas of the De Sitter universe (static only if devoid of matter) and Einstein's model but he was unable to make it stationary. In 1917, De Sitter showed he could also describe an expanding universe with his model to which Einstein responded this idea "irritates me" and to be "senseless". The same year, Einstein found a way to obtain a static universe (not collapsing or expanding) by introducing the cosmological constant in Einstein field equations. After 1915, when De Sitter showed Einstein preliminary data from Lowell Observatory that suggested that distant nebulas were speeding away, Einstein said "OK, quasi-stationary then." In 1919, before Einstein knew about the issues with his theory, he wrote that the constant was "gravely detrimental to the formal beauty of the theory."

In 1922, Alexander Friedmann derived Friedmann equations showing that the universe should be considered as dynamic linking its evolution with the cosmological constant. Einstein did not agree and while he retracted his criticism, drafts show that he considered Friedmann's solutions as unphysical. In 1927, Georges Lemaître using preliminary data showed that Einstein equation fitted better with an expanding universe. Einstein considered Lemaître's work as "abominable."

In 1929, observations by Edwin Hubble showed definitely that the universe was expanding. Lemaître in 1931, used this result to propose an early hot dense state in the universe now known as the Big Bang. In 1930, De Sitter admitted that neither Einstein's or his models could represent the universe.

In 1933, when Einstein visited Hubble at Mount Wilson Observatory, he reportedly praised Lemaître's theory "This is the most beautiful and satisfactory explanation of creation to which I have ever listened.” George Gamow writes in his book My World Line: An Informal Autobiography, “Much later, when I was discussing cosmological problems with Einstein, he remarked that the introduction of the cosmological term was the biggest blunder he ever made in his life.”

At the time, the cosmological constant was an issue in two ways: empirical data suggested it was not a static universe anyway and even if the constant is included, the static solution is unstable, any deviation leads to a dynamic universe (expanding or collapsing). In 1998, it was confirmed the accelerating expansion of the universe, which requires the reintroduction of a cosmological constant. Lawrence Krauss says that "In this instance, one might say that Einstein actually blundered twice: by introducing the cosmological constant for the wrong reason and again by throwing it out instead of exploring its implications."

=== Gravitational waves ===
After finishing his general theory of relativity in 1916, Einstein initially dismissed gravitational waves and described them incorrectly in his first paper on the topic. In a letter to Max Born circa 1936, Einstein wrote "Together with a young collaborator, I arrived at the interesting result that gravitational waves do not exist, though they had been assumed a certainty to the first approximation. This shows us that the non-linear general relativistic field equations can tell us more or, rather, limit us more than we have believed up to now.” The paper, co-authored by Nathan Rosen, on gravitational waves was sent Physical Review, but was not accepted as Howard P. Robertson (anonymous referee at the time) found mistakes, Einstein never wrote for the journal again. He resubmitted to the Journal of the Franklin Institute convinced of his argument, but convinced by Robertson who contacted his assistant Leopold Infeld, Einstein corrected his mistakes. The final version contained no singularities.

The first observation of gravitational waves was successful in 2015 by the LIGO collaboration, nearly a hundred years after Einstein prediction.

=== Strong gravitational lensing ===
Even if Einstein predicted the bending of light due to gravity, he dismissed the idea of strong gravitational lensing. As early as 1911, Einstein calculated the bending of light due to a star, which later led to the confirmation of general relativity by the Eddington experiment in 1911.

In 1936, he published a paper on gravitational lensing by stars, concluding the effect to be too small and practically unmeasurable. The paper was correct, but it did not occur to him that larger astronomical objects exist. Fritz Zwicky corrected Einstein in a paper in 1937, noting that billions of stars can form larger structures like galaxies. Strong gravitational lensing has become an essential observational tool in modern astronomy and cosmology.

== Superconductivity ==
Einstein published in 1922 a qualitative theory of superconductivity based on the idea of molecular conducting chains. Einstein came up with it during stay in Leiden in 1920 in collaboration with the cryogenics team of Heike Kamerlingh Onnes. In an address in 1923, Einstein said

So it appears unavoidable that the superconducting currents are carried by closed molecular chains (conducting chains), the electrons of which incessantly experience cyclical exchanges. Therefore, Kamerlingh Ones compares the closed currents in superconductors with Ampère's molecular currents. [ ... ] It may appear unlikely, that different kinds of atoms can combine to form conducting chains. Hence, the transition from one superconducting metal to another is perhaps never superconducting.

Kamerlingh Onnes carried various experiments to test Einstein's hypotheses. In the fourth Solvay Conference in 1924, he presented an experiment invalidating Einstein's hypothesis that superconductivity could not happen in a junction between metals with different atoms. Similarly in 1932, Walther Meissner and Ragnar Holm carried systematic experiments using superconducting tin (Sn) and lead (Pb), measuring Sn-Sn, Pb-Pb and Sn-Pb contacts without welding. They showed that superconductivity does not diminish, disproving Einstein's hypothesis.

The 1922 paper predated modern quantum mechanics, and today is regarded as being incorrect. The current theory of low temperature superconductivity, BCS theory (by John Bardeen, Leon Cooper and John Robert Schrieffer) was only worked out in 1957, thirty years after the establishing of modern quantum mechanics.

== Bose–Einstein condensation ==
In the 1920s,Satyendra Nath Bose and Einstein worked out the theory of the Bose gas, a gas of non-interacting bosons. In 1925, Einstein predicted that if temperature was low enough, all the bosons in the gas would collapse to the same quantum state occupying the same volume. For Einstein, this phenomenon was paradoxical and he wrote "this appears to be as good as impossible". This low-energy collective state became to be known as a Bose–Einstein condensate (BEC). In 1995, the first BEC was obtained by Eric Allan Cornell and Carl Wieman’s team at JILA.

== Quantum mechanics ==
By 1926, quantum mechanics was reinterpreted under Schrödinger equation by Erwin Schrödinger and by the matrix mechanics of Werner Heisenberg. Einstein knew of Louis de Broglie's matter wave so he was eager to accept Schrödinger's wave mechanics. However he considered that Heisenberg matrix mechanics violated energy conservation. It was later demonstrated that both formulations were equivalent. Einstein changed his attitude afterwards but was still worried on interpretations he wrote to Max Born "Quantum mechanics is certainly imposing. But an inner voice tells me that it is not yet the real thing. The theory says a lot, but does not really bring us any closer to the secret of the ‘old one.’ I, at any rate, am convinced that He is not playing at dice."

In 1927, Einstein came up with an interpretation of quantum mechanics based on particle trajectories. However, he withdrew the draft from publication because it failed to describe many-body systems. Specifically because the factorisability of the wavefunction did not imply that the force acting on the particles could be decomposed. David Bohm addressed this issue in the 1950s with the introduction of the quantum potential in De Broglie–Bohm theory.

Einstein was also worried of the postulated wave function collapse. During the fifth Solvay Conference in 1927, he presented a simple thought experiment in which a particle delocalized in space, will immediately take a precise position after measurement, violating special relativity. According to Einstein, Heisenberg–Born theory requires an action at a distance mechanism. Einstein considered the incompleteness of quantum mechanics and that a solution would require the particle to have a hidden position during its evolution. Various issues where also discussed with Niels Bohr, leading to the Bohr–Einstein debates.

In 1935, in their EPR paper, Einstein, Boris Podolsky and Nathan Rosen argued that quantum mechanics cannot be a complete description of reality. They considered the implications two quantum entangled particles where the momentum of particle is measured as well as the position of the other particle. As position and momentum are incompatible but can have simultaneous results, then it was considered that the wavefunction was incomplete as it cannot be an eigenfunction of both position and momentum. Many authors, including Bohr wrote a refutation to the EPR paper, but there was no consensus on the nature of the error.

The next development came in 1964 when John Stewart Bell proved his Bell's theorem that would allow to test local hidden-variable theory. Conclusive experimental evidence was obtained in 1982 with Aspect's experiment. These results and further Bell tests showed that in accordance to Bell's theorem, there cannot be local hidden variables in the local sense as in Einstein view.

== Unified field theory ==
Einstein spent many years pursuing the unified field theory of physics, and published many papers from 1930s up until his passing in April of 1955. Einstein was never able to prove the unified field theory, he commented in April 1950 that "all attempts to obtain a deeper knowledge of the foundations of physics seem doomed to me unless the basic concepts are in accordance with general relativity from the beginning". Einstein tried several approaches including Kaluza theory and geometric approaches.

Theoretical physicists have not yet formulated a widely accepted, consistent theory that combines general relativity and the Standard Model to form a theory of everything. Trying to combine the graviton with the strong and electroweak interactions leads to fundamental difficulties and the resulting theory is not renormalizable. The incompatibility of the two theories remains a key unsolved problems in physics.
