= Exchange force =

Exchange force may refer to:

- Exchange interaction, an interaction mediated by exchange particles
- Exchange interaction, a magnetic interaction arising from the exchange symmetry between identical particles

== See also ==
- Exchange symmetry
- Fundamental interaction
- Holstein–Herring method
