= EMR Telemetry =

EMR (Electro-Mechanical Research) Telemetry was a division of Weston Instruments, Inc. based in Sarasota, Florida. EMR started in 1957 and was sold to several different companies throughout its existence. EMR has been owned or operated by companies such as Fairchild Camera and Instrument, Schlumberger LTD, Loral, Lockheed Martin. Currently, the Aviation Recorder Division of L-3 Communications operates the Sarasota facility. EMR products included telemetry processing equipment and space-rated data transmission system, cockpit voice recorders (CVR) and flight data recorders (FDR).

EMR products have been used in many space projects such as Project Mercury, Project Gemini, Ranger 7 and the Pioneer 10 and Pioneer 11 missions. EMR also worked on several classified projects and the X-20 Dyna-Soar prior to the program's cancellation in 1963.

== See also ==
- Project Mercury Summary
- Project Gemini - Concept and Design
- The Pioneer Jupiter Team
- L-3 Communications Aviation Recorders
- Google Maps View of the old EMR facility
