= Exact solutions of classical central-force problems =

In the classical central-force problem of classical mechanics, some potential energy functions $V(r)$ produce motions or orbits that can be expressed in terms of well-known functions, such as the trigonometric functions and elliptic functions. This article describes these functions and the corresponding solutions for the orbits.

== General problem ==
Let $r = 1/u$. Then the Binet equation for $u(\varphi)$ can be solved numerically for nearly any central force $F(1/u)$. However, only a handful of forces result in formulae for $u$ in terms of known functions. The solution for $\varphi$ can be expressed as an integral over $u$

$$\varphi = \varphi_{0} + \frac{L}{\sqrt{2m}} \int ^{u} \frac{du}{\sqrt{E_{\mathrm{tot}} - V(1/u) - \frac{L^{2}u^{2}}{2m}}}$$

A central-force problem is said to be "integrable" if this integration can be solved in terms of known functions.

If the force is a power law, i.e., if $F(r) = ar^{n}$, then $u$ can be expressed in terms of circular functions and/or elliptic functions if $n$ equals 1, -2, -3 (circular functions) and -7, -5, -4, 0, 3, 5, -3/2, -5/2, -1/3, -5/3 and -7/3 (elliptic functions).

If the force is the sum of an inverse quadratic law and a linear term, i.e., if $F(r) = \frac{a}{r^2} + cr$, the problem also is solved explicitly in terms of Weierstrass elliptic functions.

== Bibliography ==
- Whittaker ET (1937). A Treatise on the Analytical Dynamics of Particles and Rigid Bodies, with an Introduction to the Problem of Three Bodies (4th ed.). New York: Dover Publications. ISBN 978-0-521-35883-5.
- Izzo, D. and Biscani, F. (2014). Exact Solution to the constant radial acceleration problem. Journal of Guidance Control and Dynamic.
