= Salisbury screen =

The Salisbury screen is a way of reducing the reflection of radio waves from a surface. It was one of the first concepts in radar absorbent material, an aspect of "stealth technology", used to prevent enemy radar detection of military vehicles. It was first applied to ship radar cross section (RCS) reduction. The Salisbury screen was invented by American engineer Winfield Salisbury in the early 1940s (see patent filing date). The patent was delayed because of wartime security.

== Method of operation ==
Salisbury screens operate on the same principle as optical antireflection coatings used on the surface of camera lenses and glasses to prevent them from reflecting light. The easiest to understand Salisbury screen design consists of three layers: a ground plane which is the metallic surface that needs to be concealed, a lossless dielectric of a precise thickness (a quarter of the wavelength of the radar wave to be absorbed), and a thin glossy screen.

1. When the radar wave strikes the front surface of the dielectric, it is split into two waves.
2. One wave is reflected from the glossy surface screen. The second wave passes into the dielectric layer, is reflected from the metal surface, and passes back out of the dielectric into the air.
3. The extra distance the second wave travels causes it to be 180° out of phase with the first wave by the time it emerges from the dielectric surface
4. When the second wave reaches the surface, the two waves combine and cancel each other out due to the phenomenon of interference. Therefore, there is no wave energy reflected back to the radar receiver.

To understand the cancellation of the waves requires an understanding of the concept of interference. When two electromagnetic waves that are coherent and are traveling in the same space interact, they combine to form a single resultant wave. If the two waves are "in phase" so their peaks coincide, they add, and the output intensity is the sum of the two waves' intensities. However, if the two waves are a half-wavelength "out of phase", so the positive peaks of one wave coincide with the negative peaks of the other, the two waves subtract, and the difference is zero.

The thickness of the dielectric is made equal to a quarter of the wavelength (λ/4) of the expected radar wave. Since the second wave (in step 2.) travels the thickness of the dielectric twice (once going in and once coming out), the extra distance it travels is a half-wavelength (λ/2). So it is a half wavelength out of phase with the first wave when they combine, and the two waves cancel.

== Disadvantages ==
There are significant disadvantages to the concept which have limited the use of Salisbury screens. One is that the simple Salisbury design above works well only at a single radar frequency, so the enemy needs only to change its frequency to defeat it. More complicated multilayer Salisbury designs can cover a band of frequencies, but only by increasing the thickness, and at best cover only a fraction of the radar spectrum.

Another problem is the thickness of the screen itself. Radar wavelengths range between 10 cm and 1 mm, thus the thickness of the screen (a quarter-wavelength) must be at most 2.5 cm, and multilayer screens are much thicker. Adding this much bulk to the surfaces of aircraft can unacceptably degrade aerodynamic performance. Research is being conducted on ultra thin Salisbury screens using the Sievenpiper HIGP (high impedance ground plane) (source: Wiley Periodicals, Inc., Microwave Opt. Technol. Lett.), which shows remarkable improvements to the thickness of the screen.
