= Enthalpy of neutralization =

Change in enthalpy during an acid-base reaction

In chemistry and thermodynamics, the enthalpy of neutralization (Δ_{n}H) is the change in enthalpy that occurs when one equivalent of an acid and a base undergo a neutralization reaction to form water and a salt. It is a special case of the enthalpy of reaction. It is defined as the energy released with the formation of 1 mole of water. When a reaction is carried out under standard conditions at the temperature of 298 K (25 °C) and 1 bar of pressure and one mole of water is formed, the heat released by the reaction is called the standard enthalpy of neutralization (Δ_{n}H^{⊖}).

The heat (Q) released during a reaction is

$$Q = mc_p \Delta T$$

where m is the mass of the solution, c_{p} is the specific heat capacity of the solution, and ∆T is the temperature change observed during the reaction. From this, the standard enthalpy change (∆H) is obtained by division with the amount of substance (in moles) involved.

$$\Delta H = - \frac{Q}{n}$$

When a strong acid, HA, reacts with a strong base, BOH, the reaction that occurs is

$$\ce{H+ + OH^- -> H2O}$$

as the acid and the base are fully dissociated and neither the cation B^{+} nor the anion A^{−} are involved in the neutralization reaction. The enthalpy change for this reaction is −57.62 kJ/mol at 25 °C.

For weak acids or bases, the heat of neutralization is pH-dependent. In the absence of any added mineral acid or alkali, some heat is required for complete dissociation. The total heat evolved during neutralization will be smaller.

e.g. $\ce{HCN + NaOH -> NaCN + H2O};\ \Delta H$ = −12 kJ/mol at 25 °C

The heat of ionization for this reaction is equal to (−12 + 57.3) = 45.3 kJ/mol at 25 °C.
