= Engineering diffraction =

Engineering diffraction refers to a sub-field of neutron scattering which investigates microstructural features that influence the mechanical properties of materials. These include:

1. lattice strain, a measure of distortion in crystals
2. texture, a measure of grain orientations
3. dislocation density, a measure of the microstructure
4. grain morphology
