= Elektronika (journal) =

- Discipline: Electronics, communications, photonics, optics, image science
- Language: English, Polish
- Edited by: Jerzy Klamka

Publication details
- History: 1959-present
- Publisher: Association of Polish Electrical Engineers (Poland)
- Frequency: Monthly

Standard abbreviations
- ISO 4: Elektronika

Indexing
- ISSN: 0033-2089
- OCLC no.: 312264582

Links
- Journal homepage; Online table of contents

Elektronika is a monthly peer-reviewed scientific journal published by the Association of Polish Electrical Engineers. It covers various topics in electronics, communications, photonics, and optics. The journal cooperates with the IEEE Poland Section, Polish Academy of Sciences, and the Photonics Society of Poland. It is abstracted and indexed in Scopus and INSPEC. The journal contains the following sections: electronics, communications, materials research, optical technology, information processing, lasers, photonics, and information technology.
