= ERF damper =

An ERF damper or electrorheological fluid damper, is a type of quick-response active non-linear damper used in high-sensitivity vibration control.
