= Exponential dichotomy =

In the mathematical theory of dynamical systems, an exponential dichotomy is a property of an equilibrium point that extends the idea of hyperbolicity to non-autonomous systems.

== Definition ==
If

$$\dot{\mathbf{x}} = A(t)\mathbf{x}$$

is a linear non-autonomous dynamical system in R^{n} with fundamental solution matrix Φ(t), Φ(0) = I, then the equilibrium point 0 is said to have an exponential dichotomy if there exists a (constant) matrix P such that P^{2} = P and positive constants K, L, α, and β such that

$$|| \Phi(t) P \Phi^{-1}(s) || \le Ke^{-\alpha(t - s)}\mbox{ for }s \le t < \infty$$

and

$$|| \Phi(t) (I - P) \Phi^{-1}(s) || \le Le^{-\beta(s - t)}\mbox{ for }s \ge t > -\infty.$$

If furthermore, L = 1/K and β = α, then 0 is said to have a uniform exponential dichotomy.

The constants α and β allow us to define the spectral window of the equilibrium point, (−α, β).

== Explanation ==
The matrix P is a projection onto the stable subspace and I − P is a projection onto the unstable subspace. What the exponential dichotomy says is that the norm of the projection onto the stable subspace of any orbit in the system decays exponentially as t → ∞ and the norm of the projection onto the unstable subspace of any orbit decays exponentially as t → −∞, and furthermore that the stable and unstable subspaces are conjugate (because $\scriptstyle P \oplus (I - P) = \mathbb{R}^n$).

An equilibrium point with an exponential dichotomy has many of the properties of a hyperbolic equilibrium point in autonomous systems. In fact, it can be shown that a hyperbolic point has an exponential dichotomy.
