= Electromagnetics (journal) =

- Discipline: Electrical engineering
- Language: English
- Edited by: H. Y. David Yang

Publication details
- History: 1981–present
- Publisher: Taylor & Francis
- Frequency: 8/year
- Impact factor: 0.9 (2025)

Standard abbreviations
- ISO 4: Electromagnetics

Indexing
- CODEN: ETRMDV
- ISSN: 0272-6343 (print); 1532-527X (web)
- LCCN: 81645924
- OCLC no.: 728402509

Links
- Journal homepage; Online access; Online archive

Electromagnetics is a peer-reviewed scientific journal that is published by Taylor & Francis. It covers all aspects of electromagnetics and electromagnetic materials. The editor-in-chief is H. Y. David Yang (University of Illinois at Chicago).

== Abstracting and indexing ==
Electromagnetics is abstracted and indexed by:

- Science Citation Index
- Current Contents/Engineering, Computing & Technology
- CSA Electronics & Communications Abstracts
- Engineering Information
- CSA Solid State & Superconductivity

According to the Journal Citation Reports, the journal has a 2025 impact factor of 0.9.
