= Eugen Brodhun =

German physicist

Eugen Heinrich Eduad Ernst Brodhun (15 October 1860 – 19 September 1938) was a German physicist.

He developed the "Lummer-Brodhun-Würfel" (Lummer-Brodhun spectro-photometer) with Otto Lummer in 1889.
