= Physlet =

Physlets are physics applets that are free for non-commercial use and were created by the same team as the Open Source Physics Project. Since their creation at Davidson College in 1998, over 2,000 individual exercises have been created using Physlets for the teaching and learning of astronomy and physics on a variety of levels and a variety of settings. Physlets have also been used in a number of textbooks, and have been translated into a number of languages including: Spanish, Slovenian, German, Hebrew, and Portuguese.

The original Physlet-based interactive materials relied on Java applets. With the 2014 release of the new HTML5 standards, browsers gradually ceased supporting plug-ins, such as Java. In 2018-2019, Physlet Java Applets were ported to JavaScript/HTML5 in collaboration with Robert Hanson (St. Olaf College) using the java2script-SwingJS platform, which allows Physlet-based materials to run on any platform (desktop, laptop, tablet, phone) using any recent JavaScript-enabled browser.

== Recent Developments ==
On July 1, 2018, the third, all electronic, JavaScript version of the book, Physlets Physics 3E, was released under a Creative Commons Attribution-NonCommercial-NoDerivs License on the ComPADRE National Science Digital Library.

On April 15, 2019, the third, all electronic, JavaScript version of the book, Physlets Quantum Physics 3E, was released under a Creative Commons Attribution-NonCommercial-NoDerivs License on the ComPADRE National Science Digital Library.

== Design ==
Physlets are small, flexible Java applets that can be used in the teaching of physics and other sciences. In particular:

- Physlets use simple graphics to convey only the salient features of physical phenomena.
- Physlet-based exercises can be used as part of almost any curriculum with almost any teaching style.
- Physlets are created and controlled with JavaScript, meaning that with only 24 Physlets, there can be hundreds of Physlet-based exercises created.
- Physlets are Web based and run on any platform (Windows, Mac OS X, or Linux).
- Physlets are free for noncommercial use. The Java programs themselves are free and can be downloaded from the ComPADREPhyslet site.

== Requirements ==
Physlets were created using the Java programming language, and they were accessed via a web browser as Java applets. Now in JavaScript/HTML5, the Physlet-based curricular materials in Physlet Physics 3E and Physlet Quantum Physics 3E run on any platform (desktop, laptop, tablet, phone) using any recent JavaScript-enabled browser.

As "Physlet" is a registered trademark, this word may not be appropriate to name arbitrary Java applets that demonstrate physical laws without approval from the trademark owners.
