= External flow =

In fluid mechanics, external flow is a flow that boundary layers develop freely, without constraints imposed by adjacent surfaces. It can be defined as the flow of a fluid around a body that is completely submerged in it. Examples include fluid motion over a flat plate (inclined or parallel to the free stream velocity) and flow over curved surfaces such as a sphere, cylinder, airfoil, or turbine blade, water flowing around submarines, and air flowing around a truck; a 2000 paper analyzing the latter used computational fluid dynamics to model the three-dimensional flow structure and pressure distribution on the external surface of the truck. In a 2008 paper, external flow was said to be "arguably is the most common and best studied case in soft matter systems.

The term can also be used simply to describe flow in any body of fluid external to the system under consideration.

In external co-flow, fluid in the external region occurs in the same direction as flow within the system of interest; this contrasts with external counterflow.
