= EBOR =

The Experimental Beryllium Oxide Reactor (EBOR) was a 10MWt helium cooled beryllium moderated nuclear reactor at Idaho National Laboratory. It never achieved criticality.

== History ==
The project started on February 17, 1958 as the Maritime Gas-Cooled Reactor. The project started with a contract between the U.S. Atomic Energy Commission and General Dynamics. The goal of the project was to create a small nuclear reactor for use in merchant shipping or in a medium sized power plant. The main goals for the reactor were a simple design, low maintenance costs and maximum efficiency over a wide range of power settings.

In December 1960 the project was authorized to construct a 10-Mw test reactor to determine the characteristics of the Beryllium Oxide gas cooled system. The EBOR was designed to test the basic fuel element and moderator designs for the final reactor. The EBOR used a Helium cooling system and was an intermediate step towards a prototype power plant. The plan was to use a closed cycle turbine or a steam cycle with the reactor to make a small land based or maritime power plant. This plan was abandoned as the reactor never achieved criticality.

== See also ==
- UHTREX a helium cooled graphite moderated reactor.
