= Electron magnetic resonance =

In physics, biology and chemistry, electron magnetic resonance (EMR) is an interdisciplinary field that covers both electron paramagnetic resonance (EPR, also known as electron spin resonance – ESR) and electron cyclotron resonance (ECR). EMR looks at electrons rather than nuclei or ions as in nuclear magnetic resonance (NMR) and ion cyclotron resonance (ICR) respectively.
