= Symmetry (physics) =

Feature of a system that is preserved under some transformation

First Brillouin zone of FCC lattice showing symmetry labels

A symmetry of a physical system is a physical or mathematical feature of the system (observed or intrinsic) that is preserved or remains unchanged under some transformation.

A family of particular transformations may be continuous (such as rotation of a circle) or discrete (e.g., reflection of a bilaterally symmetric figure, or rotation of a regular polygon). Continuous and discrete transformations give rise to corresponding types of symmetries. Mathematically, symmetries are described by symmetry groups; continuous symmetries can be described by Lie groups while discrete symmetries are described by finite groups, lattice groups or other discrete groups. Symmetries are frequently amenable to mathematical formulations such as group representations.

Symmetries can be exploited to simplify many problems in physics and explain physical phenomena such as conservation laws, but symmetry principles also play a foundational role in all of the fundamental theories of modern physics.

One of the most important examples of symmetry in physics is that the speed of light has the same value in all frames of reference, which is described in special relativity by a group of transformations of the spacetime known as the Poincaré group. Other important examples include the invariance of the form of physical laws under arbitrary differentiable coordinate transformations in general relativity, and the gauge invariances of electromagnetism and the Standard Model of particle physics.

== As a kind of invariance ==
Invariance is specified mathematically by transformations that leave some property (e.g. quantity) unchanged. This idea can apply to basic real-world observations. For example, temperature may be homogeneous throughout a room. Since the temperature does not depend on the position of an observer within the room, we say that the temperature is invariant under a shift in an observer's position within the room.

Similarly, a uniform sphere rotated about its center will appear exactly as it did before the rotation. The sphere is said to exhibit spherical symmetry. A rotation about any axis of the sphere will preserve the shape of its surface from any given vantage point.

=== Invariance in force ===
The above ideas lead to the useful idea of invariance when discussing observed physical symmetry; this can be applied to symmetries in forces as well.

For example, an electric field due to an electrically charged wire of infinite length is said to exhibit cylindrical symmetry, because the electric field strength at a given distance r from the wire will have the same magnitude at each point on the surface of a cylinder (whose axis is the wire) with radius r. Rotating the wire about its own axis does not change its position or charge density, hence it will preserve the field. The field strength at a rotated position is the same. This is not true in general for an arbitrary system of charges.

In Newton's theory of mechanics, given two bodies, each with mass m, starting at the origin and moving along the x-axis in opposite directions, one with speed v_{1} and the other with speed v_{2} the total kinetic energy of the system (as calculated from an observer at the origin) is 1/2m(v_{1}^{2} + v_{2}^{2}) and remains the same if the velocities are interchanged. The total kinetic energy is preserved under a reflection in the y-axis.

The last example above illustrates another way of expressing symmetries, namely through the equations that describe some aspect of the physical system. The above example shows that the total kinetic energy will be the same if v_{1} and v_{2} are interchanged.

== Local and global ==
Symmetries may be broadly classified as global or local. A global symmetry is one that keeps a property invariant for a transformation that is applied simultaneously at all points of spacetime, whereas a local symmetry is one that keeps a property invariant when a possibly different symmetry transformation is applied at each point of spacetime; specifically a local symmetry transformation is parametrised by the spacetime coordinates, whereas a global symmetry is not. Local symmetries play an important role in physics as they form the basis for gauge theories.

== Spacetime and internal ==
The most familiar types of symmetries are spacetime symmetries, those involving transformations of spacetime or the way it is mathematically described. For example, both the Galilean invariance of Newtonian mechanics and Lorentz invariance of special relativity state that the laws of physics are the same in all inertial reference frames, intuitively meaning that observers should be able to derive the same laws of physics regardless of where they are or what speed they are travelling at, but acceleration, including rotational motion, changes the apparent laws of physics by introducing fictitious forces such as the Coriolis force. One of the major achievements of general relativity is the formulation of laws of physics which hold even in accelerated reference frames, a symmetry property known as general covariance. See § Spacetime for the transformations describing these spacetime symmetries.

In contrast to spacetime symmetries, internal symmetries are more abstract mathematical symmetries which do not involve a transformation of spacetime or reference frame, but of the properties of the particles or fields described by the theory. Examples include the approximate isospin symmetry of nuclear physics, and the more general approximate flavour symmetry in particle physics, in which some of the laws governing particle interactions are invariant under swapping particles of different flavour - this can be described as a "rotation" of the states of particles (or, more precisely, the quantum fields which describe them) in an abstract "flavour space". These symmetries are global, in that the same flavour rotation must be applied at every point in physical spacetime. In contrast, the gauge theories of electromagnetism and the Yang-Mills theories which describe the forces in the Standard Model are defined by local internal symmetries; for example, the strong force is invariant under rotations in color space, where the rotation applied is allowed to vary with the point in spacetime.

== Continuous ==
The two examples of rotational symmetry described above – spherical and cylindrical – are each instances of continuous symmetry. These are characterised by invariance following a continuous change in the geometry of the system. For example, the wire may be rotated through any angle about its axis and the field strength will be the same on a given cylinder. Mathematically, continuous symmetries are described by transformations that change continuously as a function of their parameterization. An important subclass of continuous symmetries in physics are spacetime symmetries.

=== Spacetime ===
Continuous spacetime symmetries are symmetries involving transformations of space and time. These may be further classified as spatial symmetries, involving only the spatial geometry associated with a physical system; temporal symmetries, involving only changes in time; or spatio-temporal symmetries, involving changes in both space and time.

- Time translation: A physical system may have the same features over a certain interval of time Δt; this is expressed mathematically as invariance under the transformation t → t + a for any real parameters t and t + a in the interval. For example, in classical mechanics, a particle solely acted upon by gravity will have gravitational potential energy mgh when suspended from a height h above the Earth's surface. Assuming no change in the height of the particle, this will be the total gravitational potential energy of the particle at all times. In other words, by considering the state of the particle at some time t_{0} and also at t_{0} + a, the particle's total gravitational potential energy will be preserved.
- Spatial translation: These spatial symmetries are represented by transformations of the form r→ → r→ + a→ and describe those situations where a property of the system does not change with a continuous change in location. For example, the temperature in a room may be independent of where the thermometer is located in the room.
- Spatial rotation: These spatial symmetries are classified as proper rotations and improper rotations. The former are just the 'ordinary' rotations; mathematically, they are represented by orthogonal matrices with unit determinant. The latter are represented by orthogonal matrices with determinant −1 and consist of a proper rotation combined with a spatial reflection. For example, a sphere has proper rotational symmetry. Other types of spatial rotations are described in the article Rotation symmetry.
- Poincaré transformations: These are spatio-temporal symmetries which preserve distances in Minkowski spacetime, i.e. they are isometries of Minkowski space. They are studied primarily in special relativity. Those isometries that leave the origin fixed are called Lorentz transformations and give rise to the symmetry known as Lorentz covariance.
- Homotheties (also known as dilatations) and special conformal transformations: These are transformations which do not preserve ordinary spacial distances or those of Minkowski spacetime, so are not isometries, but belong to a more general class of spacetime symmetries called conformal symmetries which preserve orientations and angles. The Poincaré transformations are also conformal.

Mathematically, spacetime symmetries are usually described by smooth vector fields on a smooth manifold. The underlying local diffeomorphisms associated with the vector fields correspond more directly to the physical symmetries, but the vector fields themselves are more often used when classifying the symmetries of the physical system.

Some of the most important vector fields are Killing vector fields which are those spacetime symmetries that preserve the underlying metric structure of a manifold. In rough terms, Killing vector fields preserve the distance between any two points of the manifold and often go by the name of isometries.

== Discrete ==
A discrete symmetry is a symmetry that describes non-continuous changes in a system. For example, a square possesses discrete rotational symmetry, as only rotations by multiples of right angles will preserve the square's original appearance. Discrete symmetries sometimes involve some type of 'swapping', these swaps usually being called reflections or interchanges.

Discrete spacetime symmetries include: the following.

- Time reversal or T-symmetry: Many laws of physics describe real phenomena when the direction of time is reversed. Mathematically, this is represented by the transformation, $t \, \rightarrow - t$. For example, Newton's second law of motion still holds if, in the equation $F \, = m \ddot {r}$, $t$ is replaced by $-t$. This may be illustrated by recording the motion of an object thrown up vertically (neglecting air resistance) and then playing it back. The object will follow the same parabolic trajectory through the air, whether the recording is played normally or in reverse. Thus, position is symmetric with respect to the instant that the object is at its maximum height.
- Parity inversion, parity or P-symmetry: These are represented by transformations of the form $\vec{r} \, \rightarrow - \vec{r}$ and indicate an invariance property of a system when the coordinates are 'inverted'. This is sometimes described as a symmetry between an object or system and its mirror image, but care must be taken; a mirror image is a reflection through a single plane, while parity is simultaneous reflection across all three coordinate planes.
- Glide reflection: These are represented by a composition of a translation and a reflection. These symmetries occur in some crystals and in some planar symmetries, known as wallpaper symmetries.
- Inversion transformation: These are anti-conformal discrete transformations, meaning that they preserve angles but do not preserve orientation.

There are also discrete internal symmetries, including the following.

- Charge conjugation or C-symmetry: Some models in particle physics are invariant under the interchange of each particle with its antiparticle.

=== C, P, and T in fundamental physics ===
The C, P and T symmetries are particularly important in particle physics. Many of the laws of physics are invariant under these symmetries, but as demonstrated by the Wu experiment, the weak nuclear force violates P-symmetry. It was formerly believed that the combination CP (i.e. simultaneous application of the C- and P-transformations) may nonetheless be a true symmetry, but it was later discovered this is also violated in certain interactions. The Standard Model of particle physics accounts for this "CP violation" but is invariant under the combination CPT in accordance with the CPT Theorem.

== More general notions of symmetry ==
In addition to the classical symmetries covered by most of this article, some more general notions of symmetry have been proposed which are not described by the action of groups, but by some more general mathematical objects.

=== Supersymmetry ===
Supersymmetry is a hypothetical symmetry between the two different kinds of particles which appear in particle physics, the bosons and the fermions. Motivated by major unsolved problems in physics such as dark matter, the hierarchy problem and the unification of the microscopic fundamental forces, a supersymmetric extension of the Standard Model has been proposed in which each type of boson has a fermionic partner, called a superpartner, and vice versa. Supersymmetry is also a major ingredient of String theory. However, supersymmetry has not yet been experimentally verified: no known particle has the correct properties to be a superpartner of any other known particle. Mathematically, supersymmetry is described by supergroups and Lie superalgebras.

=== Generalized symmetries ===
Generalized symmetries encompass a number of recently recognized generalizations of the concept of a global symmetry. These include higher form symmetries, higher group symmetries, non-invertible symmetries, and subsystem symmetries.

== The role of Lie groups ==
The transformations describing physical symmetries typically form a mathematical group. Group theory is an important area of mathematics for physicists.

Continuous symmetries are specified mathematically by continuous groups (called Lie groups). Many physical symmetries are isometries and are specified by symmetry groups. Sometimes this term is used for more general types of symmetries. The set of all proper rotations (about any angle) through any axis of a sphere form a Lie group called the special orthogonal group $\operatorname{SO}(3)$. (The '3' refers to the three-dimensional space of an ordinary sphere.) Thus, the symmetry group of the sphere with proper rotations is $\operatorname{SO}(3)$. Any rotation preserves distances on the surface of the ball. The set of all Lorentz transformations form a group called the Lorentz group (this may be generalised to the Poincaré group).

A type of physical theory based on local symmetries is called a gauge theory and the symmetries natural to such a theory are called gauge symmetries. The theory of electromagnetism has the abelian gauge group $\operatorname{U}(1)$, which corresponds to the invariance of the electrical and magnetic fields under particular transformations of the potentials. The fundamental interactions in the Standard Model are described by a Yang-Mills theory with the non-abelian gauge group $\operatorname{SU}(3)\times\operatorname{SU}(2)\times\operatorname{U}(1)$, with the $\operatorname{SU}(3)$ being the gauge group of the strong force and the $\operatorname{SU}(2)\times\operatorname{U}(1)$ being that of the unified electroweak force. Early in the history of the universe, the latter symmetry was spontaneously broken to the $\operatorname{U}(1)$ of electromagnetism by the Higgs mechanism, causing the separation of the weak force and the electromagnetic force.

=== Conservation laws and symmetry ===
The symmetry properties of a physical system are intimately related to the conservation laws characterizing that system. Noether's theorem gives a precise description of this relation. The theorem states that each continuous symmetry of a physical system implies that some physical property of that system is conserved. Conversely, each conserved quantity has a corresponding symmetry. For example, spatial translation symmetry (i.e. homogeneity of space) gives rise to conservation of (linear) momentum, and temporal translation symmetry (i.e. homogeneity of time) gives rise to conservation of energy. In quantum field theory, the Ward–Takahashi identity plays a similar role to the one played by Noether's theorem in classical physics.

The following table summarizes some symmetries and the associated conserved quantity. For internal symmetries, we distinguish between "global gauge symmetries", a slight abuse of language by which we mean the global symmetry obtained by choosing a constant parameter in a local gauge transformation, and approximate or accidental global symmetries. The global gauge symmetries are exact symmetries of the Standard Model, corresponding to exactly conserved quantities; since they arise from a gauge theory, they are "protected" in the sense that they are not broken by quantisation or renormalisation. The conserved quantities of these symmetries are the charges to which the associated forces couple. A symmetry being approximate means that it is not a true symmetry but would be one if certain parameters of the theory (such as particle masses or coupling constants) were set to zero, and an accidental symmetry is one which is a symmetry of some low-energy effective theory but might not be broken in a more fundamental theory; in either case, there is no gauge invariance protecting the symmetry, so processes are known (in the case of (strong) isospin and hypercharge) or expected to exist in physics beyond the Standard Model (in the case of $B-L$) in which the associated "conserved" quantity is not actually conserved.

Class	Invariance	Conserved quantity
Proper orthochronous Poincaré symmetry	translation in time (homogeneity in time)	energy $E$
	translation in space (homogeneity)	linear momentum $\mathbf{p}$
	rotation in space (isotropy)	angular momentum $\mathbf{L}=\mathbf{r}\times\mathbf{p}$
	Lorentz-boost (isotropy)	$\mathbf{N}=c^2t\mathbf{p}-E\mathbf{r}$ (gives motion of center of mass)
Approximate or accidental internal symmetries	$\operatorname{SU}(2)$ (strong) isospin symmetry	isospin
	$\operatorname{SU}(3)$ flavour symmetry	(strong) isospin and hypercharge
	$\operatorname{U}(1)_{B-L}$	B − L
Global gauge symmetry	Electromagnetic $\operatorname{U}(1)$	electric charge
	Electroweak $\operatorname{U}(1)_Y$	weak hypercharge
	Electroweak $\operatorname{SU}(1)_L$	weak isospin
	Strong (QCD) $\operatorname{SU}(3)$	color charge

== Symmetry transformations of fields ==
Continuous symmetries in physics preserve transformations. One can specify a symmetry by showing how a very small transformation affects various particle fields. The commutator of two of these infinitesimal transformations is equivalent to a third infinitesimal transformation of the same kind hence they form a Lie algebra.

A general coordinate transformation described as the general field $h(x)$ (also known as a diffeomorphism) has the infinitesimal effect on a scalar $\phi(x)$, spinor $\psi(x)$ or vector field $A(x)$ that can be expressed (using the Einstein summation convention):

$$\delta\phi(x) = h^{\mu}(x)\partial_{\mu}\phi(x)$$
$$\delta\psi^\alpha(x) = h^{\mu}(x)\partial_{\mu}\psi^\alpha(x) +  \partial_\mu h_\nu(x) \sigma_{\mu\nu}^{\alpha \beta} \psi^{\beta}(x)$$
$$\delta A_\mu(x) = h^{\nu}(x)\partial_{\nu}A_\mu(x) + A_\nu(x)\partial_\mu h^{\nu}(x)$$

Without gravity only the Poincaré symmetries are preserved which restricts $h(x)$ to be of the form:

$$h^{\mu}(x) = M^{\mu \nu}x_\nu + P^\mu$$

where M is an antisymmetric matrix (giving the Lorentz and rotational symmetries) and P is a general vector (giving the translational symmetries). Other symmetries affect multiple fields simultaneously. For example, local gauge transformations apply to both a vector and spinor field:

$$\delta\psi^\alpha(x) = \lambda(x).\tau^{\alpha\beta}\psi^\beta(x)$$
$$\delta A_\mu(x) = \partial_\mu \lambda(x)
,$$

where $\tau$ are generators of a particular Lie group. So far the transformations on the right have only included fields of the same type. Supersymmetries are defined according to how the mix fields of different types.

Another symmetry which is part of some theories of physics and not in others is scale invariance which involve Weyl transformations of the following kind:

$$\delta \phi(x) = \Omega(x) \phi(x)$$

If the fields have this symmetry then it can be shown that the field theory is almost certainly conformally invariant also. This means that in the absence of gravity h(x) would restricted to the form:

$$h^{\mu}(x) = M^{\mu \nu}x_\nu + P^\mu + D x_\mu + K^{\mu} |x|^2 - 2 K^\nu x_\nu x_\mu
,$$

with D generating scale transformations and K generating special conformal transformations. For example, N = 4 supersymmetric Yang–Mills theory has this symmetry while general relativity does not although other theories of gravity such as conformal gravity do. The 'action' of a field theory is an invariant under all the symmetries of the theory. Much of modern theoretical physics is to do with speculating on the various symmetries the Universe may have and finding the invariants to construct field theories as models.

In string theories, since a string can be decomposed into an infinite number of particle fields, the symmetries on the string world sheet is equivalent to special transformations which mix an infinite number of fields.

== See also ==
- Conserved current & Charge
- Coordinate-free
- Covariance and contravariance
- Fictitious force
- Galilean invariance
- Principle of covariance
- General covariance
- Harmonic coordinate condition
- Inertial frame of reference
- List of mathematical topics in relativity
- Standard Model (mathematical formulation)
- Wheeler–Feynman absorber theory
