= Invariant (physics) =

Type of observable in a physical system

In theoretical physics, an invariant is an observable of a physical system which remains unchanged under some transformation. Invariance, as a broader term, also applies to the no change of form of physical laws under a transformation, and is closer in scope to the mathematical definition. Invariants of a system are deeply tied to the symmetries imposed by its environment.

Invariance is an important concept in modern theoretical physics, and many theories are expressed in terms of their symmetries and invariants.

== Examples ==
In classical and quantum mechanics, invariance of space under translation results in momentum being an invariant and the conservation of momentum, whereas invariance of the origin of time, i.e. translation in time, results in energy being an invariant and the conservation of energy. In general, by Noether's theorem, any invariance of a physical system under a continuous symmetry leads to a fundamental conservation law.

In crystals, the electron density is periodic and invariant with respect to discrete translations by unit cell vectors. In very few materials, this symmetry can be broken due to enhanced electron correlations.

Another examples of physical invariants are the speed of light, and charge and mass of a particle observed from two reference frames moving with respect to one another (invariance under a spacetime Lorentz transformation), and invariance of time and acceleration under a Galilean transformation between two such frames moving at low velocities.

Quantities can be invariant under some common transformations but not under others. For example, the velocity of a particle is invariant when switching coordinate representations from rectangular to curvilinear coordinates, but is not invariant when transforming between frames of reference that are moving with respect to each other. Other quantities, like the speed of light, are always invariant.

Physical laws are said to be invariant under transformations when their predictions remain unchanged. This generally means that the form of the law (e.g. the type of differential equations used to describe the law) is unchanged in transformations so that no additional or different solutions are obtained.

For example the rule describing Newton's force of gravity between two chunks of matter is the same whether they are in this galaxy or another (translational invariance in space). It is also the same today as it was a million years ago (translational invariance in time). The law does not work differently depending on whether one chunk is east or north of the other one (rotational invariance). Nor does the law have to be changed depending on whether you measure the force between the two chunks in a railroad station, or do the same experiment with the two chunks on a uniformly moving train (principle of relativity).

— David Mermin

Covariance and contravariance generalize the mathematical properties of invariance in tensor mathematics, and are frequently used in electromagnetism, special relativity, and general relativity.

== Informal usage ==
In the field of physics, the adjective covariant (as in covariance and contravariance of vectors) is often used informally as a synonym for "invariant". For example, the Schrödinger equation does not keep its written form under the coordinate transformations of special relativity. Thus, a physicist might say that the Schrödinger equation is not covariant. In contrast, the Klein–Gordon equation and the Dirac equation do keep their written form under these coordinate transformations. Thus, a physicist might say that these equations are covariant.

Despite this usage of "covariant", it is more accurate to say that the Klein–Gordon and Dirac equations are invariant, and that the Schrödinger equation is not invariant. Additionally, to remove ambiguity, the transformation by which the invariance is evaluated should be indicated.

== See also ==
- Casimir operator
- Charge (physics)
- Conservation law
- Conserved quantity
- Covariance group
- General covariance
- Eigenvalues and eigenvectors
- Invariants of tensors
- Killing form
- Physical constant
- Principle of covariance
- Poincaré group
- Scalar (physics)
- Symmetry (physics)
- Uniformity of nature
- Weyl transformation
