= Time symmetry =

Time symmetry may refer to:

- Time-translation symmetry
- Time-reversal symmetry aka time reversal symmetry
