= Accidental symmetry =

Type of symmetry in quantum theory

== In field theory ==
In physics, particularly in renormalization theory, an accidental symmetry is a symmetry which is present in an effective field theory because the operators in the Lagrangian that violate this symmetry are irrelevant operators. Since the contribution by irrelevant operators at low energies is small, the low energy theory appears to have this symmetry.

In the Standard Model, the lepton number and the baryon number are accidental symmetries, while in lattice models, rotational invariance is accidental.

== In Quantum Mechanics ==
The connection between symmetry and degeneracy (that is, the fact that apparently unrelated quantities turn out to be equal) is familiar in every day experience. Consider a simple example, where we draw three points on a plane, and calculate the distance between each of the three points. If the points are placed randomly, then in general all of these distances will be different. However, if the points are arranged so that a rotation by 120 degrees leaves the picture invariant, then the distances between them will all be equal (as this situation describes an equilateral triangle). The observed degeneracy boils down to the fact that the system has a D_{3} symmetry.

In quantum mechanics, calculations (at least formally) boil down to the diagonalization of Hermitian matrices - in particular, the Hamiltonian, or in the continuous case, the solution of linear differential equations. Again, observed degeneracies in the eigenspectrum are a consequence of discrete (or continuous) symmetries. In the latter case, Noether's theorem also guarantees a conserved current. "Accidental" symmetry is the name given to observed degeneracies that are apparently not a consequence of symmetry.

The term is misleading as often the observed degeneracy is not accidental at all, and is a consequence of a 'hidden' symmetry which is not immediately obvious from the Hamiltonian in a given basis. The non relativistic Hydrogen atom is a good example of this - by construction, its Hamiltonian is invariant under the full rotation group in 3 dimensions, SO(3). A less obvious feature is that the Hamiltonian is also invariant under SO(4), the extension of SO(3) to 4D, of which SO(3) is a subgroup (another way of saying this is that all possible rotations in 3D are also possible in 4D - we just don't rotate about the additional axis). This gives rise to the 'accidental' degeneracy observed in the Hydrogenic eigenspectrum.

For another example, consider the Hermitian matrix:

$$\begin{bmatrix}
0 &-0.5&-\sqrt{0.5}&0.5\\
-0.5&-\sqrt{2}&0&0\\
-\sqrt{0.5}&0&0&0\\
0.5&0&0&\sqrt{2}\\
\end{bmatrix}$$

Although there are already some suggestive relationships between the matrix elements, it is not clear what the symmetry of this matrix is at first glance. However, it is easy to demonstrate that by a unitary transformation, this matrix is equivalent to:

$$\begin{bmatrix}
0&1&0&0\\
1&0&1&0\\
0&1&0&1\\
0&0&1&0\\
\end{bmatrix}$$

Which can be verified directly by numerically (or analytically - see Chebyshev polynomials) diagonalising the sub-matrix formed by removing the first row and column. Rotating the basis defining this sub matrix using the resulting unitary brings the original matrix into the originally stated form. This matrix has a P_{4} permutation symmetry, which in this basis is much easier to see, and could constitute a 'hidden' symmetry. In this case, there are no degeneracies in the eigenspectrum. The technical reason for this is that each eigenstate transforms with respect to a different irreducible representation of P_{4}. If one encountered a case where some group of eigenstates correspond to the same irreducible representation of the 'hidden' symmetry group, a degeneracy would be observed.

Although for this simple 4x4 matrix the symmetry could have been guessed (it was after all, always there to begin with), if the matrix was larger, it would have been more difficult to spot.

== See also ==
- Renormalization
