= Yasushi Takahashi =

Japanese theoretical physicist

Yasushi Takahashi (高橋 康, Takahashi Yasushi; December 12, 1924 – February 12, 2013) was a Japanese theoretical physicist, known for the Ward–Takahashi identity.

Yasushi was born in Osaka, Japan and spent his childhood in Japan and in Taiwan. He attended university in Japan and studied theoretical physics before coming to North America for post doctoral work. In 1957, he moved to Ireland to work at the Dublin institute for Advanced Studies. He met his wife, Betty and had two sons, Hiroshi and Atushi. In 1968, the family relocated to Edmonton when he was appointed as a professor in the department of Physics at the University of Alberta. His dedication to the research in Quantum Electrodynamics lead to the Ward-Takahashi Identity. He was a Fellow of both the Royal Society of Canada and the American Physical Society, as well as a Member of the Royal Irish Academy. He collaborated with many physicists from all around the world and inspired many students through teaching and the physics textbooks he wrote. In his spare time, Yasushi enjoyed writing short stories, doing carpentry and listening to classical music. He will be remembered as an outstanding physicist, caring teacher, and loving husband, father and friend.

== Biography ==
- 1924 Birth in Osaka
- 1951 B.S. Nagoya University
- Fulbright Scholarships
- 1953 Research associate, University of Rochester
- 1954 D.Sc.
- 1955 Research associate, Iowa State University
- 1957 Scholar, Dublin Institute for Advanced Studies - He moved to Ireland, where he met his wife.
- 1958 Associate Professor, Dublin Institute for Advanced Studies
- 1960 Professor, Dublin Institute for Advanced Studies
- 1968 Professor, University of Alberta - His family moved to Edmonton.
- 2013 Death in Edmonton

== Memberships ==
- Fellow of Royal Society of Canada
- Fellow of American Physical Society
- Member of Royal Irish Academy

== Awards ==
- Soryushi Medal (2003)

== Bibliography ==
- An introduction to field quantization (Pergamon, Oxford, 1968)
