= Symmetry in problem solving =

Problem solving strategy

Symmetry in problem solving is one of the general methods used in mathematics and science to solve problems. Problem solving plays a large part in the teaching of mathematics, science and engineering. The use of symmetry as one of a number of problem solving strategies (heuristics) was first stated in 1945 by George Pólya in his book How to solve it.

== Usage ==
A hexagon divided symmetrically into 6 equilateral triangles to assist in calculating its area

Symmetry can be used in a variety of ways to assist in problem solving.

- Visualisation: by visualising the problem sometimes symmetry is revealed which simplifies finding a solution. Visualisation can be done by rearranging the problem expression into a more symmetric form, or by drawing a picture of the problem which reveals hidden symmetrical structure. Diagramming can be used to provide insight into the structure of a problem which may be obscured by its written formulation.
- Arguing "by symmetry": using a symmetry argument often clarifies a problem, leading to a quicker solution. For example, algebraic symmetry allows the permutation of the variables in an equation without changing it.
- Simplification: algebraic expressions and equations often benefit from simplification using symmetry. An example is the use of substitutions in expressions. Another example is switching from Cartesian coordinates to polar, cylindrical, or spherical coordinates to better suit the problem.
- Inheritance: if the problem has symmetry, the solution will often inherit that symmetry.
- Eliminating impossible solutions: symmetry can be used to rule out potential solutions that would contradict the structure of the problem.
- Breaking down the problem: if the problem has a symmetrical structure it may be sufficient to solve only part of it, and then the full solution can follow by extension. For example, to calculate the area of a regular hexagon, divide it into equilateral triangles, calculate the area of a triangle using the formula half base times height by applying the Pythagorean theorem, and then multiply by 6. Pólya believed that symmetry assisted in problem solving by reducing and ordering the observable facts.

== Examples ==
=== Mathematics ===
Using symmetry to sum the first 100 integers (traditionally attributed to Carl Friedrich Gauss)

The sum of the integers from 1 to 100 can be calculated by pairing the outer two integers (1+100=101), the next two integers (2+99=101) and continuing the process to the two inmost integers (50+51=101). The process yields 50 pairs each with a sum of 101, totalling 5,050. The solution of the problem is traditionally attributed to Carl Friedrich Gauss. The line of integers has reflection symmetry at its midpoint; the solver can think of folding at the line of reflection to bring each of the pairs together.

Problem: What is the area of a square inscribed in a circle, which itself is inscribed in a larger square? Solution: The small square has half the area of the large square.

It is not immediately obvious what is the area of a small square inscribed in a circle, which itself is inscribed in a large square. However, by rotating the small square by 90° and then drawing the two diagonals of the small square, it becomes clear that the small square is composed of 4 identical triangles (red) and the large square of 8 identical triangles (blue and red), and therefore the small square has half the area of the large square. The use of the rotation symmetry operation simplifies finding the solution.

The mathematical theory of symmetry, that is group theory, is now widely recognised for its problem-solving utility. The field of solutions of differential equations is largely driven by symmetry considerations.

=== Physics ===
Symmetry is ubiquitous in solving problems in modern physics; for example, Albert Einstein used symmetry arguments in his 1905 paper On the electrodynamics of moving bodies in developing his special theory of relativity. Conservation theorems are closely connected with the symmetry properties of physical systems (Noether's theorem). Group theory and Lie algebras are extensively used in solving problems in quantum mechanics and in many other areas of physics.

=== Chemistry ===
Symmetry considerations are frequently used in chemistry to solve problems. Symmetry is used in structural determinations, for the prediction of molecular electronic transitions, and in the interpretation of chemical reactivity, and crystallographic and spectroscopic data. Symmetry can also be used in organic synthesis and catalysis as a means to increase the stereoselectivity of chemical reactions. The mechanism of pericyclic reactions can be predicted by the application of the Woodward–Hoffmann rules (the conservation of orbital symmetry) which are based on the symmetries of molecular orbitals.

== Education ==
Secondary school classroom and professional development studies have shown that symmetry is one of the effective strategies for mathematical problem solving, and aids students in pattern recognition, algebraic manipulation, and geometric reasoning. Symmetry is also useful to students in solving physics problems. National mathematics standards and curricula normally incorporate goals for problem solving and for understanding and using symmetry, for example the standards in the USA.

== History ==
In modern times, the use of symmetry to solve geometrical problems is common, as expressed by the phrase "... (and so) by symmetry ...", however in Greek antiquity geometers, while perhaps unconsciously using the principle of symmetry, would not have used such a phrase as the word symmetry (Ancient Greek: summetria) had the meaning of commensurability.

In 1945 George Pólya published How to solve it in which symmetry was one of the general strategies that could be used to solve problems. In his later book Mathematical Discovery: On Understanding, Learning, and Teaching Problem Solving Pólya stated: "We expect that any symmetry found in the data and condition of the problem will be mirrored by the solution."

TRIZ is a problem-solving methodology in the engineering field invented by Genrich Altshuller in 1946. TRIZ is based on 40 problem-solving principles, one of which is asymmetry. For example, changing the shape of an object from symmetrical to asymmetrical may solve the problem of users attempting to connect two components in the wrong way: the asymmetry forces the correct connection.
