= Conservation law =

Scientific law regarding conservation of a physical property

In physics, a conservation law states that a particular measurable property of an isolated physical system does not change as the system evolves over time. Exact conservation laws include conservation of mass-energy, conservation of linear momentum, conservation of angular momentum, and conservation of electric charge. There are also many approximate conservation laws, which apply to such quantities as mass, parity, lepton number, baryon number, strangeness, hypercharge, etc. These quantities are conserved in certain classes of physical processes, but not in all.

A local conservation law is usually expressed mathematically as a continuity equation, a partial differential equation which gives a relation between the amount of the quantity and the "transport" of that quantity. It states that the amount of the conserved quantity at a point or within a volume can only change by the amount of the quantity which flows in or out of the volume.

From Noether's theorem, every differentiable symmetry leads to a local conservation law. Other conserved quantities can exist as well.

== Conservation laws as fundamental laws of nature ==
Conservation laws are fundamental to our understanding of the physical world, in that they describe which processes can or cannot occur in nature. For example, the conservation law of energy states that the total quantity of energy in an isolated system does not change, though it may change form. In general, the total quantity of the property governed by that law remains unchanged during physical processes. With respect to classical physics, conservation laws include conservation of energy, mass (or matter), linear momentum, angular momentum, and electric charge. With respect to particle physics, particles cannot be created or destroyed except in pairs, where one is ordinary and the other is an antiparticle. With respect to symmetries and invariance principles, three special conservation laws have been described, associated with inversion or reversal of space, time, and charge.

Conservation laws are considered to be fundamental laws of nature, with broad application in physics, as well as in other fields such as chemistry, biology, geology, and engineering.

Most conservation laws are exact, or absolute, in the sense that they apply to all possible processes. Some conservation laws are partial, in that they hold for some processes but not for others.

One particularly important result concerning local conservation laws is Noether's theorem, which states that there is a one-to-one correspondence between each one of them and a differentiable symmetry of the Universe. For example, the local conservation of energy follows from the uniformity of time and the local conservation of angular momentum arises from the isotropy of space, i.e. because there is no preferred direction of space. Notably, there is no conservation law associated with time-reversal, although more complex conservation laws combining time-reversal with other symmetries are known.

== Exact laws ==
A partial listing of physical conservation equations due to symmetry that are said to be exact laws, or more precisely have never been proven to be violated:

Conservation law	Respective Noether symmetry invariance		Number of independent parameters (i.e. dimension of phase space)	
Conservation of energy E	Time-translation invariance	Poincaré invariance	1	translation of time along t-axis
Conservation of linear momentum p	Space-translation invariance	Poincaré invariance	3	translation of space along x,y,z axes
Conservation of angular momentum L = r × p	Rotation invariance	Poincaré invariance	3	rotation of space about x,y,z axes
Conservation of boost 3-vector N = tp − Er	Lorentz-boost invariance	Poincaré invariance	3	Lorentz-boost of space-time along x,y,z axes
Conservation of electric charge	U(1)_{Q} Gauge invariance		1	translation of electrodynamic scalar potential field along V-axis (in phase space)
Conservation of color charge	SU(3)_{C} Gauge invariance		3	translation of chromodynamic potential field along r,g,b-axes (in phase space)
Conservation of weak isospin	SU(2)_{L} Gauge invariance		1	translation of weak potential field along axis in phase space
Conservation of the difference between baryon and lepton numbers B − L	U(1)_{B−L} Gauge invariance		1	

Another exact symmetry is CPT symmetry, the simultaneous inversion of space and time coordinates, together with swapping all particles with their antiparticles; however being a discrete symmetry Noether's theorem does not apply to it. Accordingly, the conserved quantity, CPT parity, can usually not be meaningfully calculated or determined.

== Approximate laws ==
There are also approximate conservation laws. These are approximately true in particular situations, such as low speeds, short time scales, or certain interactions.

- Conservation of (macroscopic) mechanical energy (approximately true for processes close to free of dissipative forces like friction)
- Conservation of (rest) mass (approximately true for nonrelativistic speeds)
- Conservation of baryon number (See chiral anomaly and sphaleron)
- Conservation of lepton number (In the Standard Model)
- Conservation of flavor (violated by the weak interaction)
- Conservation of strangeness (violated by the weak interaction)
- Conservation of space-parity (violated by the weak interaction)
- Conservation of charge-parity (violated by the weak interaction)
- Conservation of time-parity (violated by the weak interaction)
- Conservation of CP parity (violated by the weak interaction)
- Conservation of CPT symmetry (In the Standard Model).

== Global and local conservation laws ==
The total amount of some conserved quantity in the universe could remain unchanged if an equal amount were to appear at one point A and simultaneously disappear from another separate point B. For example, an amount of energy could appear on Earth without changing the total amount in the Universe if the same amount of energy were to disappear from some other region of the Universe. This weak form of "global" conservation is really not a conservation law because it is not Lorentz invariant, so phenomena like the above do not occur in nature. Due to special relativity, if the appearance of the energy at A and disappearance of the energy at B are simultaneous in one inertial reference frame, they will not be simultaneous in other inertial reference frames moving with respect to the first. In a moving frame one will occur before the other; either the energy at A will appear before or after the energy at B disappears. In both cases, during the interval energy will not be conserved.

A stronger form of conservation law requires that, for the amount of a conserved quantity at a point to change, there must be a flow, or flux of the quantity into or out of the point. For example, the amount of electric charge at a point is never found to change without an electric current into or out of the point that carries the difference in charge. Since it only involves continuous local changes, this stronger type of conservation law is Lorentz invariant; a quantity conserved in one reference frame is conserved in all moving reference frames. This is called a local conservation law. Local conservation also implies global conservation; that the total amount of the conserved quantity in the Universe remains constant. All of the conservation laws listed above are local conservation laws. A local conservation law is expressed mathematically by a continuity equation, which states that the change in the quantity in a volume is equal to the total net "flux" of the quantity through the surface of the volume. The following sections discuss continuity equations in general.

== Differential forms ==
In continuum mechanics, the most general form of an exact conservation law is given by a continuity equation. For example, conservation of electric charge q is
$$\frac{\partial \rho}{\partial t} = - \nabla \cdot \mathbf{j} \,$$
where ∇⋅ is the divergence operator, ρ is the density of q (amount per unit volume), j is the flux of q (amount crossing a unit area in unit time), and t is time.

If we assume that the motion u of the charge is a continuous function of position and time, then
$$\begin{align}
\mathbf{j} &= \rho \mathbf{u} \\
\frac{\partial \rho}{\partial t} &= - \nabla \cdot (\rho \mathbf{u}) \,.
\end{align}$$

In one space dimension this can be put into the form of a homogeneous first-order quasilinear hyperbolic equation:
$$y_t + A(y) y_x = 0$$
where the dependent variable y is called the density of a conserved quantity, and A(y) is called the current Jacobian, and the subscript notation for partial derivatives has been employed. The more general inhomogeneous case:
$$y_t + A(y) y_x = s$$
is not a conservation equation but the general kind of balance equation describing a dissipative system. The dependent variable y is called a nonconserved quantity, and the inhomogeneous term s(y,x,t) is the source, or dissipation. For example, balance equations of this kind are the momentum and energy Navier-Stokes equations, or the entropy balance for a general isolated system.

In the one-dimensional space a conservation equation is a first-order quasilinear hyperbolic equation that can be put into the advection form:
$$y_t + a(y) y_x = 0$$
where the dependent variable y(x,t) is called the density of the conserved (scalar) quantity, and a(y) is called the current coefficient, usually corresponding to the partial derivative in the conserved quantity of a current density of the conserved quantity j(y):
$$a(y) = j_y (y)$$

In this case since the chain rule applies:
$$j_x = j_y (y) y_x = a(y) y_x$$
The conservation equation can be put into the current density form:
$$y_t + j_x (y) = 0$$

In a space with more than one dimension the former definition can be extended to an equation that can be put into the form:
$$y_t + \mathbf a(y) \cdot \nabla y = 0$$

where the conserved quantity is y(r,t); ⋅ denotes the scalar product; ∇ is the nabla operator, here indicating a gradient; and a(y) is a vector of current coefficients, analogously corresponding to the divergence of a vector current density associated to the conserved quantity j(y):
$$y_t + \nabla \cdot \mathbf j(y) = 0$$

This is the case for the continuity equation:
$$\rho_t + \nabla \cdot (\rho \mathbf u) = 0$$

Here the conserved quantity is the mass, with density ρ(r,t) and current density ρu, identical to the momentum density, while u(r, t) is the flow velocity.

In the general case a conservation equation can be also a system of this kind of equations (a vector equation) in the form:
$$\mathbf y_t + \mathbf A(\mathbf y) \cdot \nabla \mathbf y = \mathbf 0$$
where y is called the conserved (vector) quantity, ∇y is its gradient, 0 is the zero vector, and A(y) is called the Jacobian of the current density. In fact as in the former scalar case, also in the vector case A(y) usually corresponding to the Jacobian of a current density matrix J(y):
$$\mathbf A( \mathbf y) = \mathbf J_{\mathbf y} (\mathbf y)$$
and the conservation equation can be put into the form:
$$\mathbf y_t + \nabla \cdot \mathbf J (\mathbf y)= \mathbf 0$$

For example, this the case for Euler equations (fluid dynamics). In the simple incompressible case they are:
$$\begin{align}
\nabla\cdot \mathbf u &= 0 \, , &
\frac{\partial \mathbf u}{\partial t} + \mathbf u \cdot \nabla \mathbf u + \nabla s &= \mathbf{0},
\end{align}$$

where:

- u is the flow velocity vector, with components in a N-dimensional space u_{1}, u_{2}, ..., u_{N},
- s is the specific pressure (pressure per unit density) giving the source term,

It can be shown that the conserved (vector) quantity and the current density matrix for these equations are respectively:

$$\begin{align}
\mathbf{y} &= \begin{pmatrix} 1 \\  \mathbf u \end{pmatrix}; &
\mathbf{J} &= \begin{pmatrix}\mathbf u\\ \mathbf u \otimes \mathbf u + s \mathbf I\end{pmatrix};
\end{align}$$

where $\otimes$ denotes the outer product.

== Integral and weak forms ==
Conservation equations can usually also be expressed in integral form: the advantage of the latter is substantially that it requires less smoothness of the solution, which paves the way to weak form, extending the class of admissible solutions to include discontinuous solutions. By integrating in any space-time domain the current density form in 1-D space:
$$y_t + j_x (y)= 0$$
and by using Green's theorem, the integral form is:
$$\int_{- \infty}^\infty y \, dx + \int_0^\infty j (y) \, dt = 0$$

In a similar fashion, for the scalar multidimensional space, the integral form is:
$$\oint \left[y \, d^N \mathbf{r} + j (y) \, dt\right] = 0$$
where the line integration is performed along the boundary of the domain, in an anticlockwise manner.

Moreover, by defining a test function φ(r,t) continuously differentiable both in time and space with compact support, the weak form can be obtained pivoting on the initial condition. In 1-D space it is:
$$\int_0^\infty \int_{-\infty}^\infty \left[ \phi_t y + \phi_x j(y) \right] dx \, dt = - \int_{-\infty}^\infty \phi(x,0) y(x,0) \, dx$$

In the weak form all the partial derivatives of the density and current density have been passed on to the test function, which with the former hypothesis is sufficiently smooth to admit these derivatives.

== See also ==
- Invariant (physics)
- Momentum
  - Cauchy momentum equation
- Energy
  - Conservation of energy and the First law of thermodynamics
- Conservative system
- Conserved quantity
  - Some kinds of helicity are conserved in dissipationless limit: hydrodynamical helicity, magnetic helicity, cross-helicity.
- Principle of mutability
- Conservation law of the Stress–energy tensor
- Riemann invariant
- Philosophy of physics
- Totalitarian principle
- Convection–diffusion equation
- Uniformity of nature

=== Examples and applications ===
- Advection
- Mass conservation, or Continuity equation
- Charge conservation
- Euler equations (fluid dynamics)
- inviscid Burgers' equation
- Kinematic wave
- Conservation of energy
- Traffic flow
