= Conserved current =

Concept in physics and mathematics that satisfies the continuity equation

In physics a conserved current is a current, $j^\mu$, that satisfies the continuity equation $\partial_\mu j^\mu=0$. The continuity equation represents a conservation law, hence the name.

Indeed, integrating the continuity equation over a volume $V$, large enough to have no net currents through its surface, leads to the conservation law$\frac{\partial}{\partial t}Q = 0\;,$where $Q = \int_V j^0 dV$ is the conserved quantity.

In gauge theories the gauge fields couple to conserved currents. For example, the electromagnetic field couples to the conserved electric current.

== Conserved quantities and symmetries ==
Conserved current is the flow of the canonical conjugate of a quantity possessing a continuous translational symmetry. The continuity equation for the conserved current is a statement of a conservation law. Examples of canonical conjugate quantities are:

- Time and energy - the continuous translational symmetry of time implies the conservation of energy
- Space and momentum - the continuous translational symmetry of space implies the conservation of momentum
- Space and angular momentum - the continuous rotational symmetry of space implies the conservation of angular momentum
- Wave function phase and electric charge - the continuous phase angle symmetry of the wave function implies the conservation of electric charge

Conserved currents play an extremely important role in theoretical physics, because Noether's theorem connects the existence of a conserved current to the existence of a symmetry of some quantity in the system under study. In practical terms, all conserved currents are the Noether currents, as the existence of a conserved current implies the existence of a symmetry. Conserved currents play an important role in the theory of partial differential equations, as the existence of a conserved current points to the existence of constants of motion, which are required to define a foliation and thus an integrable system. The conservation law is expressed as the vanishing of a 4-divergence, where the Noether charge forms the zeroth component of the 4-current.

== Examples ==
=== Electromagnetism ===
The conservation of charge, for example, in the notation of Maxwell's equations,$\frac{\partial \rho} {\partial t} + \nabla \cdot \mathbf{J} = 0$

where

- ρ is the free electric charge density (in units of C/m^{3})
- J is the current density $\mathbf J = \rho \mathbf v$ with v as the velocity of the charges.

The equation would apply equally to masses (or other conserved quantities), where the word mass is substituted for the words electric charge above.

=== Complex scalar field ===
The Klein-Gordon Lagrangian density $\mathcal{L}=\partial_\mu\phi^*\,\partial^\mu\phi +V(\phi^*\,\phi)$ of a complex scalar field $\phi:\mathbb{R}^{n+1}\mapsto\mathbb{C}$ is invariant under the symmetry transformation$\phi\mapsto\phi'=\phi\,e^{i\alpha}\, .$ Defining $\delta\phi=\phi'-\phi$ we find the Noether current $j^\mu:= \frac{d\mathcal{L}}{d \dot{\mathbf{q}}} \cdot \mathbf{Q}_r = \frac{d\mathcal{L}}{d(\partial_\mu)\phi}\,\frac{d(\delta\phi)}{d\alpha}\bigg|_{\alpha=0}+\frac{d\mathcal{L}}{d(\partial_\mu)\phi^*}\,\frac{d(\delta\phi^*)}{d\alpha}\bigg|_{\alpha=0}= i\,\phi\,(\partial^\mu\phi^*)-i\,\phi^*\,(\partial^\mu\phi)$which satisfies the continuity equation. Here $\mathbf{Q}_r$ is the generator of the symmetry, which is $\frac{d (\delta \mathbf{q})}{d \alpha_r}$ in the case of a single parameter $\alpha$.

== See also ==
- Conservation law (physics)
- Noether's theorem
