= Helicity =

Helicity may refer to:

- Helicity (fluid mechanics), the extent to which corkscrew-like motion occurs
- Helicity (particle physics), the projection of the spin onto the direction of momentum
- Magnetic helicity, the extent to which a magnetic field "wraps around itself"
- Circular dichroism, the differential absorption of left and right circularly polarized light
- A form of axial chirality
- A former name for inherent chirality

== See also ==
- Helix
