= Rotational invariance =

Function defined on an inner product space

In mathematics, a function defined on an inner product space is said to have rotational invariance if its value does not change when arbitrary rotations are applied to its argument.

== Mathematics ==
=== Functions ===
For example, the function

$$f(x,y) = x^2 + y^2$$

is invariant under rotations of the plane around the origin, because for a rotated set of coordinates through any angle θ

$$x' = x \cos \theta  - y \sin \theta$$
$$y' = x \sin \theta + y \cos \theta$$

the function, after some cancellation of terms, takes exactly the same form

$$f(x',y') = {x}^2 + {y}^2$$

The rotation of coordinates can be expressed using matrix form using the rotation matrix,

$$\begin{bmatrix} x' \\ y' \\ \end{bmatrix} = \begin{bmatrix} \cos \theta & -\sin \theta \\ \sin \theta & \cos \theta \\ \end{bmatrix}\begin{bmatrix} x \\ y \\ \end{bmatrix} ,$$

or symbolically, x′ = Rx. Symbolically, the rotation invariance of a real-valued function of two real variables is

$$f(\mathbf{x}') = f(\mathbf{Rx}) = f(\mathbf{x})$$

In words, the function of the rotated coordinates takes exactly the same form as it did with the initial coordinates, the only difference is the rotated coordinates replace the initial ones. For a real-valued function of three or more real variables, this expression extends easily using appropriate rotation matrices.

The concept also extends to a vector-valued function f of one or more variables;

$$\mathbf{f}(\mathbf{x}') = \mathbf{f}(\mathbf{Rx}) = \mathbf{f}(\mathbf{x}) .$$

In all the above cases, the arguments (here called "coordinates" for concreteness) are rotated, not the function itself.

=== Operators ===
For a function

$$f : X \rightarrow X ,$$

which maps elements from a subset X of the real line $\mathbb{R}$ to itself, rotational invariance may also mean that the function commutes with rotations of elements in X. This also applies for an operator that acts on such functions. An example is the two-dimensional Laplace operator

$$\nabla^2 = \frac{\partial^2}{\partial x^2} + \frac{\partial^2}{\partial y^2} ,$$

which acts on a function f to obtain another function ∇^{2}f. This operator is invariant under rotations.

If g is the function g(p) = f(R(p)), where R is any rotation, then (∇^{2}g)(p) = (∇^{2}f )(R(p)); that is, rotating a function merely rotates its Laplacian.

== Physics ==
In physics, if a system behaves the same regardless of how it is oriented in space, then its Lagrangian is rotationally invariant. According to Noether's theorem, if the action (the integral over time of its Lagrangian) of a physical system is invariant under rotation, then angular momentum is conserved.

=== Application to quantum mechanics ===
In quantum mechanics, rotational invariance is the property that after a rotation the new system still obeys the Schrödinger equation. That is

$$[R,E-H] = 0$$

for any rotation R. Since the rotation does not depend explicitly on time, it commutes with the energy operator. Thus for rotational invariance we must have [R, H] = 0.

For infinitesimal rotations (in the xy-plane for this example; it may be done likewise for any plane) by an angle dθ the (infinitesimal) rotation operator is

$$R = 1 + J_z d\theta \,,$$

then

$$\left[1 + J_z d\theta , \frac{d}{dt} \right] = 0 \,,$$

thus

$$\frac{d}{dt}J_z = 0\,,$$

in other words angular momentum is conserved.

== See also ==
- Axial symmetry
- Invariant measure
- Isotropy
- Maxwell's theorem
- Rotational symmetry
