= Time-translation symmetry =

Mathematical transformation in physics

Time-translation symmetry or temporal translation symmetry (TTS) is a mathematical transformation in physics that moves the times of events through a common interval. Time-translation symmetry is the law that the laws of physics are unchanged (i.e. invariant) under such a transformation. Time-translation symmetry is a rigorous way to formulate the idea that the laws of physics are the same throughout history. Time-translation symmetry is closely connected, via Noether's theorem, to conservation of energy. In mathematics, the set of all time translations on a given system form a Lie group.

There are many symmetries in nature besides time translation, such as spatial translation or rotational symmetries. These symmetries can be broken and explain diverse phenomena such as crystals, superconductivity, and the Higgs mechanism. However, it was thought until very recently that time-translation symmetry could not be broken. Time crystals, a state of matter first observed in 2017, break time-translation symmetry.

== Overview ==
Symmetries are of prime importance in physics and are closely related to the hypothesis that certain physical quantities are only relative and unobservable. Symmetries apply to the equations that govern the physical laws (e.g. to a Hamiltonian or Lagrangian) rather than the initial conditions, values or magnitudes of the equations themselves and state that the laws remain unchanged under a transformation. If a symmetry is preserved under a transformation it is said to be invariant. Symmetries in nature lead directly to conservation laws, something which is precisely formulated by Noether's theorem.

Symmetries in physics
Symmetry	Transformation	Unobservable	Conservation law
Space-translation	$\mathbf{r} \rightarrow \mathbf{r} + \delta\mathbf{r}$	absolute position in space	momentum
Time-translation	$t \rightarrow t + \delta t$	absolute time	energy
Rotation	$\mathbf{r} \rightarrow \mathbf{r}'$	absolute direction in space	angular momentum
Space inversion	$\mathbf{r} \rightarrow - \mathbf{r}$	absolute left or right	parity
Time-reversal	$t \rightarrow - t$	absolute sign of time	Kramers degeneracy
Sign reversion of charge	$e \rightarrow - e$	absolute sign of electric charge	charge conjugation
Particle substitution		distinguishability of identical particles	Bose or Fermi statistics
Internal rotation	$\psi \rightarrow e^{iN\theta}\psi$	relative phase between different normal states	particle number

=== Newtonian mechanics ===
To formally describe time-translation symmetry we say the equations, or laws, that describe a system at times $t$ and $t + \tau$ are the same for any value of $t$ and $\tau$.

For example, considering Newton's equation:

$$m\ddot{x}=-\frac{dV}{dx}(x)$$

One finds for its solutions $x=x(t)$ the combination:

$$\frac{1}{2}m\dot{x}(t)^2 + V(x(t))$$

does not depend on the variable $t$. Of course, this quantity describes the total energy whose conservation is due to the time-translation invariance of the equation of motion. By studying the composition of symmetry transformations, e.g. of geometric objects, one reaches the conclusion that they form a group and, more specifically, a Lie transformation group if one considers continuous, finite symmetry transformations. Different symmetries form different groups with different geometries. Time independent Hamiltonian systems form a group of time translations that is described by the non-compact, abelian, Lie group $\mathbb R$. TTS is therefore a dynamical or Hamiltonian dependent symmetry rather than a kinematical symmetry which would be the same for the entire set of Hamiltonians at issue. Other examples can be seen in the study of time evolution equations of classical and quantum physics.

Many differential equations describing time evolution equations are expressions of invariants associated to some Lie group and the theory of these groups provides a unifying viewpoint for the study of all special functions and all their properties. In fact, Sophus Lie invented the theory of Lie groups when studying the symmetries of differential equations. The integration of a (partial) differential equation by the method of separation of variables or by Lie algebraic methods is intimately connected with the existence of symmetries. For example, the exact solubility of the Schrödinger equation in quantum mechanics can be traced back to the underlying invariances. In the latter case, the investigation of symmetries allows for an interpretation of the degeneracies, where different configurations to have the same energy, which generally occur in the energy spectrum of quantum systems. Continuous symmetries in physics are often formulated in terms of infinitesimal rather than finite transformations, i.e. one considers the Lie algebra rather than the Lie group of transformations

=== Quantum mechanics ===
The invariance of a Hamiltonian $\hat{H}$ of an isolated system under time translation implies its energy does not change with the passage of time. Conservation of energy implies, according to the Heisenberg equations of motion, that $[ \hat{H}, \hat{H} ]=0$.

$$[ e^{i\hat{H}t/\hbar}, \hat{H} ]=0$$

or:

$$[ \hat{T}(t), \hat{H} ]=0$$

Where $\hat{T}(t)=e^{i\hat{H}t/\hbar}$ is the time-translation operator which implies invariance of the Hamiltonian under the time-translation operation and leads to the conservation of energy.

=== Nonlinear systems ===
In many nonlinear field theories like general relativity or Yang–Mills theories, the basic field equations are highly nonlinear and exact solutions are only known for 'sufficiently symmetric' distributions of matter (e.g. rotationally or axially symmetric configurations). Time-translation symmetry is guaranteed only in spacetimes where the metric is static: that is, where there is a coordinate system in which the metric coefficients contain no time variable. Many general relativity systems are not static in any frame of reference so no conserved energy can be defined.

== Time-translation symmetry breaking (TTSB) ==
Time crystals, a state of matter first observed in 2017, break discrete time-translation symmetry.

== See also ==
- Absolute time and space
- Mach's principle
- Spacetime
- Time reversal symmetry
