= Hypercharge =

Type of particle charge found in the Standard Model

In particle physics, the hypercharge (a portmanteau of hyperonic and charge) Y of a particle is a quantum number conserved under the strong interaction. The concept of hypercharge provides a single charge operator that accounts for properties of isospin, electric charge, and flavour. The hypercharge is useful to classify hadrons; the similarly named weak hypercharge has an analogous role in the electroweak interaction.

== Definition ==
Hypercharge is one of two quantum numbers of the SU(3) model of hadrons, alongside isospin I_{3}. The isospin alone was sufficient for two quark flavours — namely u and d — whereas presently 6 flavours of quarks are known.

SU(3) weight diagrams (see below) are 2 dimensional, with the coordinates referring to two quantum numbers: I_{3} (also known as I_{z}), which is the z component of isospin, and Y, which is the hypercharge (defined by strangeness S, charm C, bottomness B′, topness T′, and baryon number B). Mathematically, hypercharge is

$$Y = B + S - \frac{C - B' + T'}{3} ~.$$

Strong interactions conserve hypercharge (and weak hypercharge), but weak interactions do not.

== Relation with electric charge and isospin ==
The Gell-Mann–Nishijima formula relates isospin and electric charge

$$Q = I_3 + \tfrac{1}{2}Y,$$

where I_{3} is the third component of isospin and Q is the particle's charge.

Isospin creates multiplets of particles whose average charge is related to the hypercharge by:

$$Y = 2 \bar Q.$$

since the hypercharge is the same for all members of a multiplet, and the average of the I_{3} values is 0.

These definitions in their original form hold only for the three lightest quarks.

== SU(3) model in relation to hypercharge ==
The SU(2) model has multiplets characterized by a quantum number J, which is the total angular momentum. Each multiplet consists of 2J + 1 substates with equally-spaced values of J_{z}, forming a symmetric arrangement seen in atomic spectra and isospin. This formalizes the observation that certain strong baryon decays were not observed, leading to the prediction of the mass, strangeness and charge of the Ω^{−} baryon.

The SU(3) has supermultiplets containing SU(2) multiplets. SU(3) now needs two numbers to specify all its sub-states which are denoted by λ_{1} and λ_{2}.

(λ_{1} + 1) specifies the number of points in the topmost side of the hexagon while (λ_{2} + 1) specifies the number of points on the bottom side.

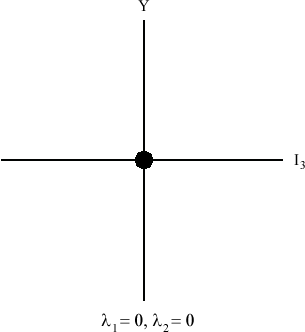
SU(3) singlet weight diagram, where Y is hypercharge and I_{3} is the third component of isospin.

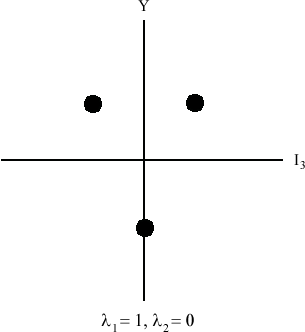
SU(3) triplet weight diagram

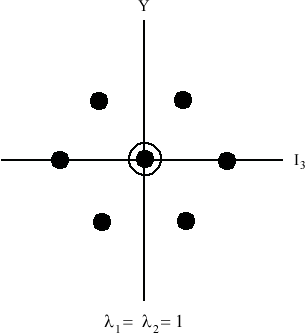
SU(3) septet, octet, and nonet weight diagram Note similarity with both charts on the right. The number used to describe the weight diagram depends on whether the particle(s) occupying the center of the diagram have one, two, or three distinct names.

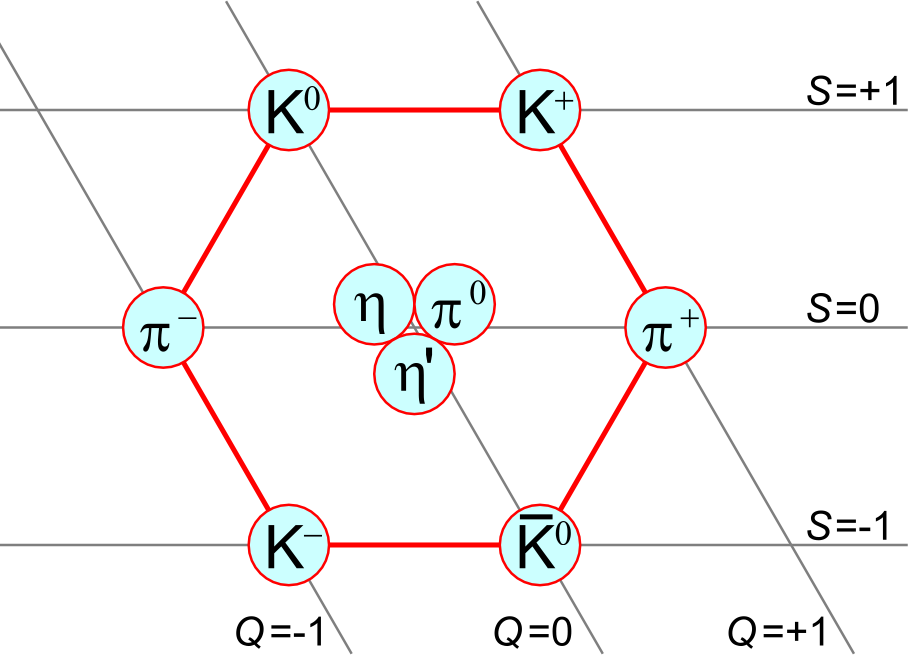
Mesons of spin 0 form a nonet. K: kaon, π: pion, η: eta meson.

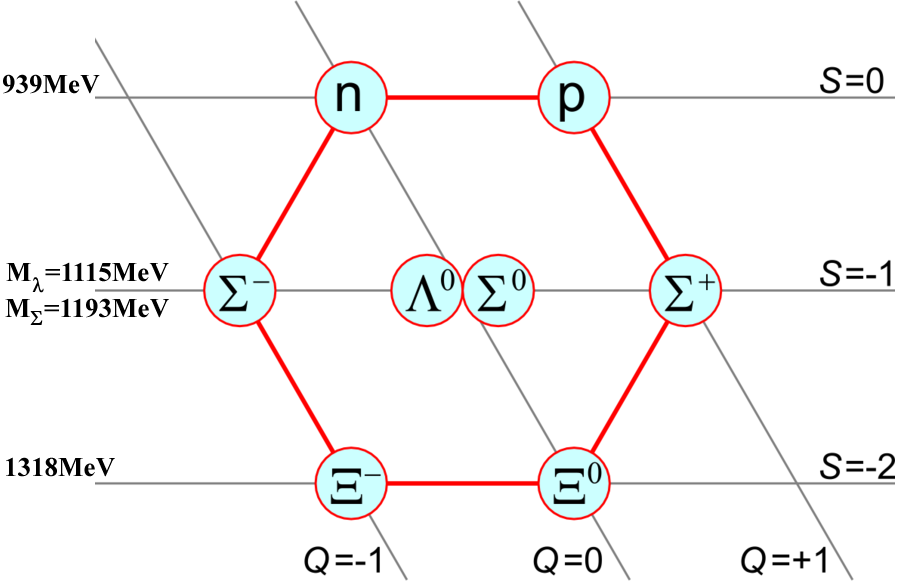
The octet of light spin-1/2 baryons described in SU(3). n: neutron, p: proton, Λ: Lambda baryon, Σ: Sigma baryon, Ξ: Xi baryon.

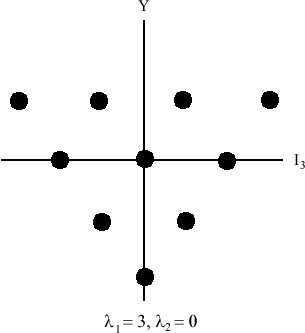
SU(3) decuplet weight diagram Note similarity with chart on the right.

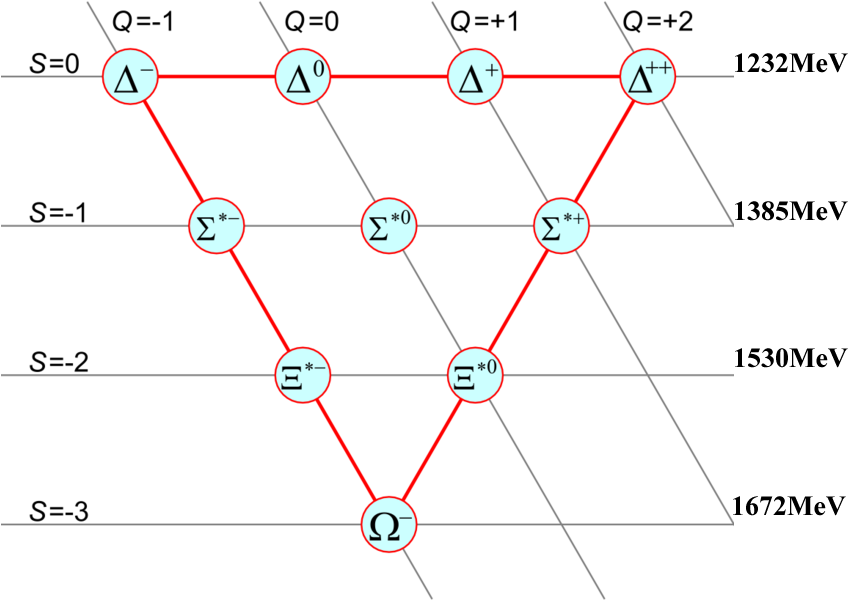
A combination of three up, down or strange quarks with a total spin of 3/2 form the so-called baryon decuplet. The lower six are hyperons. S: strangeness, Q: electric charge.

== Examples ==
- The nucleon group (protons with Q = +1 and neutrons with Q = 0 ) have an average charge of + 1/2, so they both have hypercharge Y = 1 (since baryon number B = +1 , and S = C = B′ = T′ = 0). From the Gell-Mann–Nishijima formula we know that proton has isospin I_{3} = + 1/2 , while neutron has I_{3} = − 1/2 .
- This also works for quarks: For the up quark, with a charge of + 2/3, and an I_{3} of + 1/2, we deduce a hypercharge of 1/3, due to its baryon number (since three quarks make a baryon, each quark has a baryon number of + 1/3).
- For a strange quark, with electric charge − 1/3, a baryon number of + 1/3, and strangeness −1, we get a hypercharge Y = − 2/3 , so we deduce that I_{3} = 0 . That means that a strange quark makes an isospin singlet of its own (the same happens with charm, bottom and top quarks), while up and down constitute an isospin doublet.
- All other quarks have hypercharge Y = 0 .

== Practical obsolescence ==
Hypercharge was a concept developed in the 1960s, to organize groups of particles in the "particle zoo" and to develop ad hoc conservation laws based on their observed transformations. With the advent of the quark model, it is now obvious that strong hypercharge, Y, is the following combination of the numbers of up (n_{u}), down (n_{d}), strange (n_{s}), charm (n_{c}), top (n_{t}) and bottom (n_{b}):

$$Y = \tfrac{1}{3} n_\textrm{u} + \tfrac{1}{3} n_\textrm{d} + \tfrac{4}{3} n_\textrm{c} - \tfrac{2}{3} n_\textrm{s} + \tfrac{4}{3} n_\textrm{t} - \tfrac{2}{3} n_\textrm{b} ~.$$

In modern descriptions of hadron interaction, it has become more obvious to draw Feynman diagrams that trace through the individual constituent quarks (which are conserved) composing the interacting baryons and mesons, rather than bothering to count strong hypercharge quantum numbers. Weak hypercharge, however, remains an essential part of understanding the electroweak interaction.
