= Continuous symmetry =

Symmetry-based invariance to continuous group action

In mathematics, continuous symmetry is an intuitive idea corresponding to the concept of viewing some symmetries as motions, as opposed to discrete symmetry, e.g. reflection symmetry, which is invariant under a kind of flip from one state to another. However, a discrete symmetry can always be reinterpreted as a subset of some higher-dimensional continuous symmetry, e.g. reflection of a 2-dimensional object in 3-dimensional space can be achieved by continuously rotating that object 180 degrees across a non-parallel plane.

== Formalization ==
The notion of continuous symmetry has largely and successfully been formalised in the mathematical notions of a topological group, Lie group and group action. For most practical purposes, continuous symmetry is modelled by a group action of a topological group that preserves some structure. Particularly, let $f:X\to Y$ be a function, and $G$ is a group that acts on $X$; then a subgroup $H\subseteq G$ is a symmetry of $f$ if $f(h\cdot x) = f(x)$ for all $h\in H$.

=== One-parameter subgroups ===
The simplest motions follow a one-parameter subgroup of a Lie group, such as the Euclidean group of three-dimensional space. For example translation parallel to the x-axis by u units, as u varies, is a one-parameter group of motions. Rotation around the z-axis is also a one-parameter group.

== Noether's theorem ==
Continuous symmetry has a basic role in Noether's theorem in theoretical physics, in the derivation of conservation laws from symmetry principles, specifically for continuous symmetries. The search for continuous symmetries only intensified with the further developments of quantum field theory.

== See also ==
- Goldstone's theorem
- Infinitesimal transformation
- Noether's theorem
- Sophus Lie
- Motion (geometry)
- Circular symmetry
