= Charge (physics) =

Physics property associated with symmetries

In physics, a charge is any of many different quantities, such as the electric charge in electromagnetism or the color charge in quantum chromodynamics. Charges correspond to the time-invariant generators of a symmetry group, and specifically, to the generators that commute with the Hamiltonian. Charges are often denoted by $Q$, and so the invariance of the charge corresponds to the vanishing commutator $[Q,H]=0$, where $H$ is the Hamiltonian. Thus, charges are associated with conserved quantum numbers; these are the eigenvalues of the generator $Q$. A "charge" can also refer to a point-shaped object with an electric charge and a position, such as in the method of image charges.

== Abstract definition ==
Abstractly, a charge is any generator of a continuous symmetry of the physical system under study. When a physical system has a symmetry of some sort, Noether's theorem implies the existence of a conserved current. The thing that "flows" in the current is the "charge"; the charge is the generator of the (local) symmetry group. This charge is sometimes called the Noether charge.

Thus, for example, the electric charge is the generator of the U(1) symmetry of electromagnetism. The conserved current is the electric current.

In the case of local, dynamical symmetries, associated with every charge is a gauge field; when quantized, the gauge field becomes a gauge boson. The charges of the theory "radiate" the gauge field. Thus, for example, the gauge field of electromagnetism is the electromagnetic field; and the gauge boson is the photon.

The word "charge" is often used as a synonym for both the generator of a symmetry, and the conserved quantum number (eigenvalue) of the generator. Thus, letting the upper-case letter $Q$ refer to the generator, one has that the generator commutes with the Hamiltonian ${{{1}}}$. Commutation implies that the eigenvalues (lower-case) $q$ are time-invariant: $\textstyle \frac{ \mathrm{d}q }{ \mathrm{d}t } = 0$.

So, for example, when the symmetry group is a Lie group, then the charge operators correspond to the simple roots of the root system of the Lie algebra; the discreteness of the root system accounting for the quantization of the charge. The simple roots are used, as all the other roots can be obtained as linear combinations of these. The general roots are often called raising and lowering operators, or ladder operators.

The charge quantum numbers then correspond to the weights of the highest-weight modules of a given representation of the Lie algebra. So, for example, when a particle in a quantum field theory belongs to a symmetry, then it transforms according to a particular representation of that symmetry; the charge quantum number is then the weight of the representation.

== Examples ==
Various charge quantum numbers have been introduced by theories of particle physics. These include the charges of the Standard Model:

- The color charge of quarks. The color charge generates the SU(3) color symmetry of quantum chromodynamics.
- The weak isospin quantum numbers of the electroweak interaction. It generates the SU(2) part of the electroweak SU(2) × U(1) symmetry. Weak isospin is a local symmetry, whose gauge bosons are the W and Z bosons.
- The electric charge for electromagnetic interactions. In mathematics texts, this is sometimes referred to as the $u_1$-charge of a Lie algebra module.

Note that these charge quantum numbers show up in the Lagrangian via the Gauge covariant derivative#Standard_Model.

Charges of approximate symmetries:

- The strong isospin charges. The symmetry groups is SU(2) flavor symmetry; the gauge bosons are the pions. The pions are not elementary particles, and the symmetry is only approximate. It is a special case of flavor symmetry.
- Other quark-flavor charges, such as strangeness or charm. Together with the u–d isospin mentioned above, these generate the global SU(6) flavor symmetry of the fundamental particles; this symmetry is badly broken by the masses of the heavy quarks. Charges include the hypercharge, the X-charge and the weak hypercharge.

Hypothetical charges of extensions to the Standard Model:

- The hypothetical magnetic charge is another charge in the theory of electromagnetism. Magnetic charges are not seen experimentally in laboratory experiments, but would be present for theories including magnetic monopoles.

In supersymmetry:

- The supercharge refers to the generator that rotates the fermions into bosons, and vice versa, in the supersymmetry.

In conformal field theory:

- The central charge of the Virasoro algebra, sometimes referred to as the conformal central charge or the conformal anomaly. Here, the term 'central' is used in the sense of the center in group theory: it is an operator that commutes with all the other operators in the algebra. The central charge is the eigenvalue of the central generator of the algebra; here, it is the stress–energy tensor of the two-dimensional conformal field theory.

In gravitation:

- Eigenvalues of the stress–energy tensor correspond to physical mass.

== Charge conjugation ==
In the formalism of particle theories, charge-like quantum numbers can sometimes be inverted by means of a charge conjugation operator called C. Charge conjugation simply means that a given symmetry group occurs in two inequivalent (but still isomorphic) group representations. It is usually the case that the two charge-conjugate representations are complex conjugate fundamental representations of the Lie group. Their product then forms the adjoint representation of the group.

Thus, a common example is that the product of two charge-conjugate fundamental representations of SL(2,C) (the spinors) forms the adjoint rep of the Lorentz group SO(3,1); abstractly, one writes

$$2\otimes\overline{2}=3\oplus 1 .$$

That is, the product of two (Lorentz) spinors is a (Lorentz) vector and a (Lorentz) scalar. Note that the complex Lie algebra sl(2,C) has a compact real form su(2) (in fact, all Lie algebras have a unique compact real form). The same decomposition holds for the compact form as well: the product of two spinors in su(2) being a vector in the rotation group O(3) and a singlet. The decomposition is given by the Clebsch–Gordan coefficients.

A similar phenomenon occurs in the compact group SU(3), where there are two charge-conjugate but inequivalent fundamental representations, dubbed $3$ and $\overline{3}$, the number 3 denoting the dimension of the representation, and with the quarks transforming under $3$ and the antiquarks transforming under $\overline{3}$. The Kronecker product of the two gives

$$3\otimes\overline{3}=8\oplus 1 .$$

That is, an eight-dimensional representation, the octet of the eight-fold way, and a singlet. The decomposition of such products of representations into direct sums of irreducible representations can in general be written as

$$\Lambda \otimes \Lambda' = \bigoplus_i \mathcal{L}_i \Lambda_i$$

for representations $\Lambda$. The dimensions of the representations obey the "dimension sum rule":

$$d_\Lambda \cdot d_{\Lambda'} = \sum_i \mathcal{L}_i d_{\Lambda_i}.$$

Here, $d_\Lambda$ is the dimension of the representation $\Lambda$, and the integers $\mathcal{L}$ being the Littlewood–Richardson coefficients. The decomposition of the representations is again given by the Clebsch–Gordan coefficients, this time in the general Lie-algebra setting.

== See also ==
- Casimir operator
