= Weak charge =

Type of weak interaction in nuclear and atomic physics

In nuclear physics and atomic physics, weak charge, or rarely neutral weak charge, refers to the Standard Model weak interaction coupling of a particle to the Z boson; it is named by analogy to electric charge, which measures coupling to the photon of electromagnetism. For example, for any given nuclear isotope, the total weak charge is approximately −0.99 per neutron, and +0.07 per proton. It also shows an effect of parity violation during electron scattering.

This same term is sometimes also used to refer to other, different quantities, such as weak isospin or weak hypercharge; this article concerns the use of weak charge for a quantity that measures the degree of vector coupling of a fermion to the Z boson (i.e. the coupling strength of weak neutral currents).

== Empirical formulas ==
Measurements in 2017 give the weak charge of the proton as 0.0719±0.0045 .

The weak charge may be summed in atomic nuclei, so that the predicted weak charge for ^{133}Cs (55 protons, 78 neutrons) is 55×(+0.0719) + 78×(−0.989) = −73.19, while the value determined experimentally, from measurements of parity violating electron scattering, was −72.58 .

A recent study used four even-numbered isotopes of ytterbium to test the formula Q_{w} = −0.989 N + 0.071 Z , for weak charge, with N corresponding to the number of neutrons and Z to the number of protons. The formula was found consistent to 0.1% accuracy using the ^{170}Yb, ^{172}Yb, ^{174}Yb, and ^{176}Yb isotopes of ytterbium.

In the ytterbium test, atoms were excited by laser light in the presence of electric and magnetic fields, and the resulting parity violation was observed. The specific transition observed was the forbidden transition from 6s^{2} ^{1}S_{0} to 5d6s ^{3}D_{1} (24489 cm^{−1}). The latter state was mixed, due to weak interaction, with 6s6p ^{1}P_{1} (25068 cm^{−1}) to a degree proportional to the nuclear weak charge.

== Particle values ==
This table gives the values of the electric charge (the coupling to the photon, referred to in this article as $Q_\epsilon$ (Note: $\, Q \,$ is conventionally used as the symbol for electric charge. The subscript $\ \epsilon\$ is added in this article to keep the several symbols for weak charge $\ Q_\boldsymbol\mathsf{L}\ ,$ $\ Q_\boldsymbol\mathsf{R}\ ,$ and $\ Q_\mathsf{w}\ ,$ and for electric charge $\ Q_\epsilon \$ from being as easily confused.)). Also listed are the approximate weak charge $Q_\mathsf{w}$ (the vector part of the Z boson coupling to fermions), weak isospin $T_3$ (the coupling to the W bosons), weak hypercharge $Y_\mathsf{w}$ (the coupling to the theoretical B boson) and the approximate Z boson coupling factors ($Q_\boldsymbol\mathsf{L}$ and $Q_\boldsymbol\mathsf{R}$ in the "Theoretical" section, below).

If the variable correction terms shown for different $\ \theta_\mathsf{w}\$ values are omitted, then the table's constant values for weak charge are only approximate: They happen to be more nearly exact for particles whose energies make the weak mixing angle $\ \theta_\mathsf{w} = 30^\circ\ ,$ with $\ \sin^2 \theta_\mathsf{w} = \tfrac{1}{4} ~.$ This value is very close to the typical approximately 29° angle observed in particle accelerators. The embedded formulas give more accurate values for those cases when the Weinberg angle, $\ \theta_\mathsf{w}\ ,$ is known.

Electroweak charges of Standard Model particles
Spin J	Particle(s)	Weak charge	Electric charge	Weak isospin		Weak hypercharge		Z boson coupling	
Spin J	Particle(s)	$\quad Q_\mathsf{w} ~=~$ 2 Q_{L} + 2 Q_{R}	$Q \;\mathsf{ or }\; Q_{\epsilon}$	$T_3$ Left	$T_3$ Right	$Y_\mathsf{w}$ Left	$Y_\mathsf{w}$ Right	$2\ \!Q_\mathsf{L}$ Left	$2\ \!Q_\mathsf{R}$ Right
1 /2	e^{−}, μ^{−} , τ^{−} electron, muon, tau (Note: Only (regular, non-anti-) fermion charges are listed. For the matching antifermions, the electric charge, Q_{ϵ} , has the same magnitude, but opposite sign; other charges, such as weak isospin, T_{3}, and weak hypercharge, Y_{w}, that have columns subtitled "Left" and "Right", are left-right swapped as well as sign-reversed.)	−1 + 4 sin^{2} θ_{w} ≈ 0	−1	− 1 /2	0	−1	−2	−1 + 2 sin^{2} θ_{w} ≈ − 1 /2	2 sin^{2} θ_{w} ≈ + 1 /2
1 /2	u, c, t up, charm, top	+1 − 8 /3 sin^{2} θ_{w} ≈ + 1 /3	+ 2 /3	+ 1 /2	0	+ 1 /3	+ 4 /3	1 − 4 /3 sin^{2} θ_{w} ≈ + 2 /3	− 4 /3 sin^{2} θ_{w} ≈ − 1 /3
1 /2	d, s, b down, strange, bottom	−1 + 4 /3 sin^{2} θ_{w} ≈ − 2 /3	− 1 /3	− 1 /2	0	+ 1 /3	− 2 /3	−1 + 2 /3 sin^{2} θ_{w} ≈ − 5 /6	+ 2 /3 sin^{2} θ_{w} ≈ + 1 /6
1 /2	ν_{e}, ν_{μ}, ν_{τ} neutrinos	+1	0	+ 1/2	0 (Note: Although "sterile neutrinos" are not included in the Standard Model and have not been confirmed experimentally, if they did actually exist, giving the value zero for electric charge and weak isospin, as shown, is a simple way to annotate their non-participation in any electroweak interaction, and does so in a manner consistent with all the other elementary fermions.) (Note: The whole matter of revised neutrino physics can be crudely summarized by stating that there are two generic options for new physics that make different changes to the relation between neutrinos and antineutrinos. The baseline Standard Model supposes that there are three neutrino flavors, and that each of the flavors has only left-handed neutrinos and only right-handed anti-neutrinos, making six distinct neutrino types. (Each of the other elementary fermions has twelve types.) Some speculative revisions to the current Standard Model either propose that for each flavor there is only one neutrino, which is the same particle as its antineutrino, (Note: One speculative proposal for different neutrino physics is that perhaps right-handed antineutrinos are actually the same particles as the left-handed neutrinos, the only difference between them being that they are either observed traveling in the same direction as their spin vector points, or the direction opposite their spin. If proposals like this were true, neutrinos would be Majorana particles and there would only be one kind of neutrino per lepton flavor rather than two – only three particles, not six, and the only practical difference between a neutrino and its antineutrino would be a flipped orientation of the neutrino's spin relative to its direction of travel. In the case of identical neutrinos and antineutrinos, the unique physical properties of neutrinos – unlike any other elementary fermion – would be explained as due to their zero electrical charge, and being their own antiparticles (truly neutral particles), which would make them different from all other fermions, which all do have nonzero electric charge and all do have distinct antiparticles and all do interact with the Higgs field, since interaction with the Higgs field seems to require flipping fermions' weak isospins back and forth between zero and either + 1 / 2 or − 1 / 2 (depending on the fermion), but a truly neutral fermion can't change its isospin – it must always be zero. The explanation for the current hypothetically mistaken presumption that neutrinos and antineutrinos are different particles would then be because all observable neutrinos (those with collision cross-sections large enough to feasibly detect) travel at such high speeds that laboratory measurement techniques cannot yet (in 2023) distinguish their actual speeds from the speed of light. At such high speeds, there is no way in any terrestrial laboratory for a confirmed antineutrino to later be detected interacting as a 'regular' (non-anti-) neutrino (or vice-versa). However, such an interaction might be confirmed indirectly, if during two simultaneous beta decays in the same atomic nucleus, the two separately produced antineutrinos (in this scenario, they would be "antineutrinos" in name-only) happened to collide head-on, on their way out, and annihilate before departing the nucleus – acting as each other's antiparticles during the brief moment when they are still inside a single atomic nucleus, and so still possibly close enough to interact. This is a large part of the motivation for current research seeking evidence of neutrinoless double beta decay events.) making a total of three, not six; or propose that just like every other elementary fermion, there are both left and right handed neutrinos and antineutrinos of each flavor, (Note: Another possible speculative proposal for different neutrino physics is that the known neutrinos and antineutrinos are indeed distinct particles, but are not the strangely exceptional single-handed fermions that the Standard Model currently supposes: That they are like every other type of elementary fermion (electrons, quarks, etc.), with neutrinos and antineutrinos (=2) each existing as both left-handed and right-handed particles (×2) for each of the three flavors (×3). That would make a total of 2 × 2 × 3 = 12 distinct types of neutrinos, not just the mere six types currently accounted-for in the Standard Model; note that 12 is the same number of types as every other elementary pair of fermion and antifermion, which would make neutrinos ordinary instead of peculiar. If that were the case, then naïvely applying the rules for quantum charges to the "wrong-handed" neutrinos (left handed antineutrinos and right handed regular neutrinos) would leave the "wrong-handed" neutrinos with coupling of zero to every other elementary particle in the Standard Model. Having no interactions ("sterile") would render them completely undetectable – even more "invisible" than the known neutrinos notoriously are – hence the Standard Model supposes that they aren't there because we have never seen them, but that is deficient evidence for their non-existence: We couldn't see them even if they did exist. (Absence of evidence is not evidence of absence.) If sterile neutrinos did exist, then all neutrinos could / should / might interact with the Higgs field and by doing so, consequently switch between "active" and "sterile", or equivalently, possibly change their weak isospin (T_{3}) between | T_{3} | = 1/ 2 and T_{3} = 0 , by reversing their handedness via the Higgs interaction. Seeking evidence for such events motivates current searches for otherwise unexplained disappearances of normal, active neutrinos in long-baseline beams of neutrinos. But the problem with this endeavor is the unknown, but conclusively minuscule masses of the active neutrinos: Coupling to the Higgs field is proportional to mass; minuscule mass means minuscule Higgs-field interactions, so neutrinos vanishing by a Higgs-field mediated transition from active to sterile would also have to be exceedingly rare, perhaps rare enough to make detection infeasible using currently understood experimental techniques.) making twelve, not six. (The second option would make neutrinos naturally match all the other elementary fermion-antifermion pairs.))	−1	0	+1	0
1	g, γ, Z^{0}, gluon (Note: Gluons only have color charges of the strong force and spin: Their electroweak charges are all zero, although their color charges give them distinct antiparticles (see Gluon for details). Strictly speaking, gluons are out-of-context among of the electroweak-interacting particles described by this table. However, since each of the three electrically neutral elementary vector bosons' electroweak charges all are zero, they can all be accommodated by the same row in this table, hence allowing the table to show a complete list of all elementary particles currently incorporated in the Standard Model.), photon, (Note: The quantum charges of every kind for photons and Z bosons are all zero, so the photon and Z boson are their own antiparticles: They are "truly neutral particles"; in particular, they are truly neutral vector bosons. Whilst not having charge themselves, photons and Z bosons none the less do interact with particles carrying the relevant quantum charge: electrical charge ( Q_{ϵ} ) for photons (γ), and left and right weak charges (Q_{L}, Q_{R}) for Z bosons (Z^{0}). They cannot interact with other γ or Z^{0} directly, and except at extremely high energies, usually do not interact with other γ or Z^{0} at all. However, because of quantum uncertainty even low energy versions of either particle occasionally might briefly split into a particle-antiparticle pair, each of which happens to have the electrical charge needed to interact with a γ, or the left or right weak charge needed to interact with Z^{0}, or both. After that interaction has happened, the particle-antiparticle pair recombines into the same γ or Z^{0} particle that originally split, precluding the intermediate pair – whatever it may have been – from ever being observed: The only observed effect is the change in the recombined particle's momentum. This disappearing-act makes it appear the same as if a direct Z^{0}-Z^{0} or Z^{0}-γ or γ-γ interaction had occurred. Because at normal, low energies, it depends on a fortuitous and ephemeral pair creation event, this kind of interaction of a neutral vector boson with another neutral vector boson is so rare that even though technically very slightly possible, it is treated as effectively impossible and ignored. Hence the blanket zero value for the neutral weak bosons' (γ, Z^{0}) row in the table are all almost exactly zero, but some are not precisely zero as shown.) and Z boson	0							
1	W^{+} W boson (Note: Only the W^{+} boson's charges are listed; values for its antiparticle W^{−} have reversed sign (or remain zero). The same rule applies as for all particle-antiparticle pairs: Their "charge"-like quantum numbers are equal and opposite. W bosons can interact with both photons and Z bosons, since they carry both electric charge and weak charge; for the same reason, they can also self-interact.)	+2 − 4 sin^{2} θ_{w} ≈ +1	+1	+1		0		+2 − 4 sin^{2} θ_{w} ≈ +1	
0	H^{0} Higgs boson	−1	0	− 1 /2		+1		−1	

For brevity, the table omits antiparticles. Every particle listed (except for the uncharged bosons the photon, Z boson, gluon, and Higgs boson (Note: See Higgs mechanism.) which are their own antiparticles) has an antiparticle with identical mass and opposite charge. All non-zero signs in the table have to be reversed for antiparticles. The paired columns labeled "Left" and "Right" for fermions (top four rows), have to be swapped in addition to their signs being flipped.

All left-handed (regular) fermions and right-handed antifermions interact with the W boson, and so are assigned $\ T_3 = \pm\tfrac{1}{2} ~.$ They could be referred to as "proper"-handed (that is, they have the "proper" handedness for a W^{±} interaction). Right-handed fermions and left-handed antifermions, on the other hand, do not interact with the W boson (except for electrical interaction) and therefore are assigned zero weak isospin; for that reason, they could be referred to as "wrong"-handed (i.e. they have the wrong handedness to interact with the W^{±} boson). "Proper"-handed fermions are organized into isospin doublets, while "wrong"-handed fermions are represented as isospin singlets. While "wrong"-handed particles do not interact with the W boson (no charged current interactions), all "wrong"-handed fermions known to exist do interact with the Z boson (neutral current interactions), excepting perhaps sterile neutrinos, if they exist. (Note: The exception stated for neutrinos, implying that neutrinos do not exist as left- and right-chiral superpositions might be wrong: It presumes that there are no sterile neutrinos. Whether there are or aren't any sterile neutrinos is not known; it's a question still being investigated by current particle research.)

"Wrong"-handed neutrinos (sterile neutrinos) have never been observed, but may still exist since they would be invisible to existing detectors. Sterile neutrinos, assuming they exist, are speculated to play a role in a few theoretical mechanisms that might provide neutrinos with mass (see Seesaw mechanism). The statement above, that the Z^{0} interacts with all fermions, will need an exception inserted for sterile neutrinos, if they are ever detected experimentally.

Massive fermions – except (perhaps) neutrinos – always exist in a superposition of left-handed and right-handed states, and never in pure chiral states. This mixing is caused by interaction with the Higgs field, which acts as an infinite source and sink of weak isospin and / or hypercharge, due to its non-zero vacuum expectation value (for further information see Higgs mechanism).

== Theoretical basis ==
The formula for the weak charge is derived from the Standard Model, and is given by

$$~ Q_\mathsf{w} ~=~ 2 \, T_3 - Q_\epsilon \, 4 \, \sin^2 \theta_\mathsf{w}  ~\approx~ 2 \, T_3 - Q_\epsilon \; , \qquad \mathsf{ or } \qquad  ~ Q_\mathsf{w} + Q_\epsilon ~\approx~ 2 \, T_3 ~=~ \pm 1 ; ~$$

where $~ Q_\mathsf{w} ~$ is the weak charge, (Note: Other Wikipedia articles use the weak vector coupling, $g_\mathsf{V},$ a different version of $~ Q_\mathsf{w} ~$ which is exactly half the size given here.) $T_3$ is the weak isospin, (Note: Specifically, the weak isospin for left-handed fermions, and right-handed anti-fermions (both are "proper"-handed). Weak isospin is always zero for right-handed fermions and left-handed anti-fermions (both are "wrong"-handed, that is, "wrong" for the W^{±}).) $\theta_\mathsf{w}$ is the weak mixing angle, and $\, Q_\epsilon \,$ is the electric charge. The approximation for the weak charge is usually valid, since the weak mixing angle typically is 29° ≈ 30° , and $\ 4 \sin^2 30^\circ = 1\ ,$ and $\; 4 \sin^2 29^\circ \approx 0.940\ ,$ a discrepancy of only a little more than 1 in 17 .

=== Extension to larger, composite protons and neutrons ===
This relation only directly applies to quarks and leptons (fundamental particles), since weak isospin is not clearly defined for composite particles, such as protons and neutrons, partly due to weak isospin not being conserved. One can set the weak isospin of the proton to + 1/2 and of the neutron to − 1/2, in order to obtain approximate value for the weak charge. Equivalently, one can sum up the weak charges of the constituent quarks to get the same result.

Thus the calculated weak charge for the neutron is

$$Q_\mathsf{w} = 2 \, T_3 - 4 \, Q_\epsilon \, \sin^2 \theta_\mathsf{w} = 2 \cdot \left( -\tfrac{1}{2} \right) = -1 ~\approx~ -0.99 ~.$$

The weak charge for the proton calculated using the above formula and a weak mixing angle of 29° is

$$Q_\mathsf{w} = 2 \, T_3 - 4\, Q_\epsilon \, \sin^2 \theta_\mathsf{w} ~=~ 2 \; \tfrac{1}{2} -4 \, \sin^2 29^\circ ~\approx~ 1 - 0.94016 ~=~ 0.05983 \approx 0.06 \approx 0.07 ~,$$

a very small value, similar to the nearly zero total weak charge of charged leptons (see the table above).

Corrections arise when doing the full theoretical calculation for nucleons, however. Specifically, when evaluating Feynman diagrams beyond the tree level (i.e. diagrams containing loops), the weak mixing angle becomes dependent on the momentum scale due to the running of coupling constants, and due to the fact that nucleons are composite particles.

=== Relation to weak hypercharge Y_{w} ===
Because weak hypercharge Y_{w} is given by

$$Y_\mathsf{w} = 2\, ( Q_\epsilon - T_3 ) ~$$

the weak hypercharge Y_{w} , weak charge Q_{w} , and electric charge $\, Q \equiv Q_\epsilon \,$ are related by

$$Q_\mathsf{w} + Y_\mathsf{w} = 2\,Q_\epsilon \left( 1 - 2\ \sin^2\theta_\mathsf{w} \right) = 2\,Q_\epsilon \, \cos\left( 2\, \theta_\mathsf{w} \right)\ ,$$
or equivalently
$$Q_\mathsf{w} + Y_\mathsf{w} =  Q_\epsilon + Q_\epsilon \left( 1 - 4\ \sin^2\theta_\mathsf{w} \right) \approx Q_\epsilon + 0\ ,$$

where $~ Y_\mathsf{w} ~$ is the weak hypercharge for left-handed fermions and right-handed antifermions, hence

$$Q_\mathsf{w} + Y_\mathsf{w} \approx Q_\epsilon ~,$$

in the typical case, when the weak mixing angle is approximately 30°.

=== Derivation ===
The Standard Model coupling of fermions to the Z boson and photon is given by:

$$\mathcal{L}_\mathrm{int} ~ = ~ -\bar{\Psi}_\boldsymbol{\mathsf{L}} \, \left[ \left( Q_\epsilon \, - \, T_3 \right) \, \frac{e}{\; \cos \theta_\mathsf{w} } \, B_\mu ~ + ~ T_3 \, \frac{e}{\; \sin \theta_\mathsf{w} \,} W^3_\mu \;\right] \, \bar{\sigma}^\mu \, \Psi_\boldsymbol{\mathsf{L}} ~ - ~ \bar{\Psi}_\boldsymbol{\mathsf{R}} \, \left[ \, Q_\epsilon \frac{e}{\; \cos\theta_\mathsf{w} \;} \, B_\mu \, \right] \, \sigma^\mu \, \Psi_\boldsymbol{\mathsf{R}} ~ ,$$

where

- $~\Psi_\mathsf{L}~$ and $~\Psi_\boldsymbol{\mathsf{R}}~$ are a left-handed and right-handed fermion field respectively,
- $~ B_\mu ~$ is the B boson field, $~ W^3_\mu ~$ is the W_{3} boson field, and
- $~e = \sqrt{4\pi\alpha}~$ is the elementary charge expressed as rationalized Planck units,

and the expansion uses for its basis vectors the (mostly implicit) Pauli matrices from the Weyl equation:

$$\sigma^\mu = \Bigl(\, I\,,\; ~~\sigma^1\,,\; ~~\sigma^2\,,\; ~~\sigma^3 \, \Bigr)~$$

and

$$\bar{\sigma}^\mu = \Bigl(\, I\,,\; -\sigma^1 \,,\; -\sigma^2 \,,\; -\sigma^3 \, \Bigr) ~$$

The fields for B and W_{3} boson are related to the Z boson field $Z_\mu,$ and electromagnetic field $A_\mu$ (photons) by

$$~B_\mu = \left( \, \cos \theta_\mathsf{w} \, \right) \, A_\mu - \left( \, \sin \theta_\mathsf{w} \, \right) Z_\mu ~$$

and

$$W^3_\mu = \left( \, \cos \theta_\mathsf{w} \, \right) Z_\mu ~ + ~ \left( \, \sin \theta_\mathsf{w} \, \right) \, A_\mu ~.$$

By combining these relations with the above equation and separating by $Z_\mu$ and $~A_\mu~,$ one obtains:

$$\begin{align}
\mathcal{L}_\mathrm{int} ~=~ -\bar{\Psi}_\boldsymbol{\mathsf{L}}\left[\;\left(\, Q_\epsilon \,-\, T_3 \,\right) \frac{e}{\; \cos \theta_\mathsf{w} \;}\left(\; \cos \theta_\mathsf{w} \, A_\mu - \sin \theta_\mathsf{w} \, Z_\mu \;\right) \,+\, T_3 \frac{ e }{\; \sin\theta_\mathsf{w} \;} \left(\; \cos \theta_\mathsf{w} Z_\mu \,+\, \sin \theta_\mathsf{w} \, A_\mu \;\right)\right] \bar{\sigma}^\mu \Psi_\boldsymbol{\mathsf{L}} \\
- \bar{\Psi}_\boldsymbol{\mathsf{R}} \biggl[ Q_\epsilon \, \frac{ e }{\; \cos\theta_\mathsf{w} \;}\left(\, \cos \theta_\mathsf{w} \, A_\mu \,-\, \sin \theta_\mathsf{w} \, Z_\mu \,\right) \; \biggr] \sigma^\mu  \Psi_\boldsymbol{\mathsf{R}} \\
\\
~ = ~ - ~ e \, \bar{\Psi}_\boldsymbol{\mathsf{L}} \left[\; Q_\epsilon \, A_\mu \, + \, \left(\; T_3 \, - \, Q_\epsilon \sin^2 \theta_\mathsf{w} \;\right) \frac{ 1 }{\; \cos \theta_\mathsf{w} \sin \theta_\mathsf{w} \;} \; Z_\mu \;\right] \bar{\sigma}^\mu \Psi_\boldsymbol{\mathsf{L}} \\
~ - ~ e \, \bar{\Psi}_\boldsymbol{\mathsf{R}} \left[\; Q_\epsilon \, A_\mu \, - \, Q_\epsilon \sin^2 \theta_\mathsf{w} \; \frac{ 1 }{\;\cos \theta_\mathsf{w} \, \sin \theta_\mathsf{w} \;} \; Z_\mu \;\right] \sigma^\mu \Psi_\boldsymbol{\mathsf{R}} ~ .
\end{align}$$

The $Q_\epsilon\,A_\mu$ term that is present for both left- and right-handed fermions represents the familiar electromagnetic interaction. The terms involving the Z boson depend on the chirality of the fermion, thus there are two different coupling strengths:

$$~ Q_\boldsymbol{\mathsf{L}} = T_3 - Q_\epsilon \sin^2 \theta_\mathsf{w} \quad$$
and
$$\quad Q_\boldsymbol{\mathsf{R}} = -Q_\epsilon \sin^2 \theta_\mathsf{w} ~.$$

It is however more convenient to treat fermions as a single particle instead of treating left- and right-handed fermions separately. The Weyl basis is chosen for this derivation:

$$\boldsymbol{\Psi} \equiv \begin{pmatrix}\Psi_{\boldsymbol\mathsf{L}} \\ \Psi_\boldsymbol{\mathsf{R}} \end{pmatrix} ~, \qquad \gamma^\mu \equiv \begin{pmatrix}0 & \sigma^\mu \\ \bar{\sigma}^\mu & 0 \end{pmatrix} \quad \text{ for } ~ \mu = 0, 1, 2, 3 ~;$$
$$\qquad \gamma^5 \equiv \begin{pmatrix} -I & 0 \\ ~~0 & I \end{pmatrix} ~ .$$

Thus the above expression can be written fairly compactly as:

$$\mathcal{L}_\mathrm{int} = -e \ \boldsymbol{\bar{\Psi}} \ \gamma^\mu\ \left[\ Q_\epsilon\ A_\mu\; + \; \frac{ \left(\ Q_\mathsf{w} - 2\ T_3\ \gamma^5\ \right) }{\ 2\ \sin\left(\ 2\ \theta_\mathsf{w}\ \right)\ }\; Z_\mu\ \right]\ \boldsymbol{\Psi} ~ ,$$

where

$$Q_\mathsf{w} \; \equiv \; 2 \,\left(\, Q_\boldsymbol{\mathsf{L}} + Q_\boldsymbol{\mathsf{R}} \,\right) \; = \; 2 \, T_3 - 4 \, Q_\epsilon \sin^2 \theta_\mathsf{w} ~ .$$

== See also ==
- Weak hypercharge
- Weak isospin
- Z boson
- Weak interaction
- Neutral current
