= Charged current =

One way that particles can interact with the weak force

Charged current interactions are one of two primary channels in which subatomic particles can interact by means of the weak force. These interactions are specifically mediated by the W^{+} and W^{−} bosons. The other kind of weak interactions are the neutral currents, mediated by the Z boson.

== Overview ==
The simplest Feynman diagram for beta decay. It contains a charged current interaction at each vertex.

Charged current interactions are the most easily detected class of weak interactions. The weak force is best known for mediating nuclear decay. It has very short range, but is the only force (apart from gravity) to interact with neutrinos. The weak force is communicated via the W and Z exchange particles. Of these, the W boson has either a positive or negative electric charge, and mediates neutrino absorption and emission by or with an electrically charged particle. During these processes, the W boson induces electron or positron emission or absorption, or changing the flavour of a quark as well as its electrical charge, such as in beta decay or K-capture.

By contrast, the Z particle is electrically neutral, and exchange of a Z boson leaves the interacting particles' quantum numbers unaffected, except for a transfer of momentum, spin, and energy.

Because exchange of W bosons involves a transfer of electric charge (as well as a transfer of weak isospin, while weak hypercharge is not transferred), it is known as "charged current". By contrast, exchanges of Z bosons involve no transfer of electrical charge, so it is referred to as a "neutral current". In the latter case, the word "current" has nothing to do with electricity – it simply refers to the Z bosons' movement between other particles.

== Definition ==
The name "charged current" arises due to currents of fermions coupled to the W bosons having electric charge. For example, the charged current contribution to the ν_{e}e^{−} → ν_{e}e^{−} elastic scattering amplitude is:
$$\mathfrak{M}^{\mathrm{CC}} \propto J_{\mu}^{\mathrm{(CC)}}(\mathrm{e^{-}}\to\nu_{\mathrm{e}}) \; J^{\mathrm{(CC)}\mu}(\nu_{\mathrm{e}}\to\mathrm{e^{-}}),$$
where the charged currents describing the flow of one fermion into the other are given by:
$$J^{\mathrm{(CC)\mu}}(f\to f') = \bar{u}_{f'}\gamma^{\mu}\frac{1}{2}\left(1-\gamma^{5}\right)u_{f}.$$

The W boson can couple to any particle with weak isospin (i.e. any left-handed Standard Model fermions). (Note: The W boson can also couple with any electroweak gauge boson and the Higgs boson, but these are typically not characterized as charged current interactions.)
