= Fundamental interaction =

Most basic type of physical force

In physics, the fundamental interactions or fundamental forces are interactions in nature that appear not to be reducible to more basic interactions. There are four fundamental interactions known to exist: gravity, electromagnetism, weak interaction, and strong interaction. The gravitational and electromagnetic interactions produce long-range forces whose effects can be seen directly in everyday life. The strong and weak interactions produce forces at subatomic scales and govern nuclear interactions inside atoms. Some scientists hypothesize that a fifth force might exist, but these hypotheses remain speculative.

Each of the known fundamental interactions can be described mathematically as a field. The gravitational interaction is attributed to the curvature of spacetime, described by Einstein's general theory of relativity. The other three are discrete quantum fields, and their interactions are mediated by elementary particles described by the Standard Model of particle physics.

Within the Standard Model, the strong interaction is carried by a particle called the gluon and is responsible for quarks binding together to form hadrons, such as protons and neutrons. As a residual effect, it creates the nuclear force that binds the latter particles to form atomic nuclei. The weak interaction is carried by particles called W and Z bosons, and also acts on the nucleus of atoms, mediating radioactive decay. The electromagnetic force, carried by the photon, creates electric and magnetic fields, which are responsible for the attraction between the negatively charged orbital electrons and the positively charged atomic nuclei which holds atoms together, as well as chemical bonding and electromagnetic waves, including visible light, and forms the basis for electrical technology. The electromagnetic force is far stronger than gravity, but unlike gravity, the electromagnetic force has opposing negative and positive charges. Large objects tend to have about the same number of negative charges as positive charges making them effectively uncharged with no resulting electromagnetic forces between them. Over (astronomical) distances, gravity is the dominant force, responsible for holding together the large scale structure in the universe, such as planets, stars, and galaxies. The historical success of models that show relationships between fundamental interactions have led to efforts to go beyond the Standard Model (which does not describe gravity) and combine all four forces into a theory of everything.

== History ==
=== Classical theory ===
In his 1687 theory, Isaac Newton postulated space as an infinite and unalterable physical structure existing before, within, and around all objects while their states and relations unfold at a constant pace everywhere, thus absolute space and time. Inferring that all objects bearing mass approach at a constant rate, but collide by impact proportional to their masses, Newton inferred that matter exhibits an attractive force. His law of universal gravitation implied there to be instant interaction among all objects. As conventionally interpreted, Newton's theory of motion modelled a central force without a communicating medium. Thus Newton's theory violated the tradition, going back to Descartes, that there should be no action at a distance.

In 1846, Michael Faraday explained his view that a field filled space and the lateral vibrations of these lines transmitted energy. Faraday conjectured that light was thus a vibration in the electromagnetic force field and moreover gravity could be described in a similar fashion. These speculations, ridiculed at the time, were broadly similar to modern field models.

In 1873, James Clerk Maxwell unified electricity and magnetism as effects of an electromagnetic field whose third consequence was light, travelling at constant speed in vacuum. If his electromagnetic field theory held true in all inertial frames of reference, this would contradict Newton's theory of motion, which relied on Galilean relativity. If, instead, his field theory only applied to reference frames at rest relative to a mechanical luminiferous aether—presumed to fill all space whether within matter or in vacuum and to manifest the electromagnetic field—then it could be reconciled with Galilean relativity and Newton's laws. (However, such a "Maxwell aether" was later disproven; Newton's laws did, in fact, have to be replaced.)

=== Standard Model ===
The Standard Model of elementary particles, with the fermions in the first three columns, the gauge bosons in the fourth column, and the Higgs boson in the fifth column

The Standard Model of particle physics was developed throughout the latter half of the 20th century. In the Standard Model, the electromagnetic, strong, and weak interactions associate with elementary particles, whose behaviours are modelled in quantum mechanics (QM). For predictive success with QM's probabilistic outcomes, particle physics conventionally models QM events across a field set to special relativity, altogether relativistic quantum field theory (QFT). Force particles, called gauge bosons—force carriers or messenger particles of underlying fields—interact with matter particles, called fermions.

Everyday matter consists of atoms. Atoms interact, form molecules, and manifest further properties through electromagnetic interactions among their electrons absorbing and emitting photons, the electromagnetic field's force carrier, which if unimpeded traverse potentially infinite distance. Electromagnetism's quantum field theory is quantum electrodynamics (QED).

The force carriers of the weak interaction are the massive W and Z bosons. Electroweak theory (EWT) covers both electromagnetism and the weak interaction. At the high temperatures shortly after the Big Bang, the weak interaction, the electromagnetic interaction, and the Higgs boson were originally mixed components of a different set of ancient pre-symmetry-breaking fields. As the early universe cooled, these fields split into the long-range electromagnetic interaction, the short-range weak interaction, and the Higgs boson. In the Higgs mechanism, the Higgs field manifests Higgs bosons that interact with some quantum particles in a way that endows those particles with mass.

The strong interaction, whose force carrier is the gluon, traversing minuscule distance among quarks, is modeled in quantum chromodynamics (QCD). EWT, QCD, and the Higgs mechanism comprise particle physics' Standard Model (SM). Predictions are usually made using calculational approximation methods, although such perturbation theory is inadequate to model some experimental observations (for instance bound states and solitons). Still, physicists widely accept the Standard Model as science's most experimentally confirmed theory.

== Overview of the fundamental interactions ==
An overview of the various families of elementary and composite particles, and the theories describing their interactions. Fermions are on the left, and bosons are on the right.

In the conceptual model of fundamental interactions, matter consists of fermions, which carry properties called charges and spin ±1/2 (intrinsic angular momentum ±ħ/2, where ħ is the reduced Planck constant). They attract or repel each other by exchanging bosons.

The interaction of any pair of fermions in perturbation theory can then be modelled thus:

Two fermions go in → interaction by boson exchange → two changed fermions go out.

The exchange of bosons always carries energy and momentum between the fermions, thereby changing their speed and direction. The exchange may also transport a charge between the fermions, changing the charges of the fermions in the process (e.g., turn them from one type of fermion to another). Since bosons carry one unit of angular momentum, the fermion's spin direction will flip from +1/2 to −1/2 (or vice versa) during such an exchange (in units of the reduced Planck constant). Since such interactions result in a change in momentum, they can give rise to classical Newtonian forces. In quantum mechanics, physicists often use the terms "force" and "interaction" interchangeably; for example, the weak interaction is sometimes referred to as the "weak force".

According to the present understanding, there are four fundamental interactions or forces: gravitation, electromagnetism, the weak interaction, and the strong interaction. Their magnitude and behaviour vary greatly, as described in the table below. Modern physics attempts to explain every observed physical phenomenon by these fundamental interactions.

The fundamental interactions can be compared using dimensionless coupling constants that characterize the intensity or "strength" of the interactions.

Properties of fundamental interactions at low energy
Interaction	Current theory	Mediators	Strength	Long-distance behavior (potential)	Range (m)
Weak	Electroweak theory (EWT)	W and Z bosons	1.027×10^{−5}	$\frac{1}{r} \ e^{-m_{\rm W,Z} \ r}$	10^{−18}
Strong	Quantum chromodynamics (QCD)	gluons	0.1 (short range), 1.0 (long range)	${\sim r}$ (Color confinement, see discussion below)	10^{−15}
Electromagnetic	Quantum electrodynamics (QED)	photons	1/137	$\frac{1}{r^2}$ (force)	∞
Gravitation	General relativity (GR)	gravitons (hypothetical)	5.9×10^{−39}	$\frac{1}{r^2}$ (force)	∞

The modern (perturbative) quantum mechanical view of the fundamental forces other than gravity is that particles of matter (fermions) do not directly interact with each other, but rather carry a charge, and exchange virtual particles (gauge bosons), which are the interaction carriers or force mediators. For example, photons mediate the interaction of electric charges, and gluons mediate the interaction of color charges. The full theory includes perturbations beyond simply fermions exchanging bosons; these additional perturbations can involve bosons that exchange fermions, as well as the creation or destruction of particles: see Feynman diagrams for examples.

== Interactions ==
=== Gravity ===
Gravitation is the weakest of the four interactions at the atomic scale, where electromagnetic interactions dominate.

Gravitation is the most important of the four fundamental forces for astronomical objects over astronomical distances for two reasons. First, gravitation has an infinite effective range, like electromagnetism but unlike the strong and weak interactions. Second, gravity always attracts and never repels; in contrast, astronomical bodies tend toward a near-neutral net electric charge, such that the attraction to one type of charge and the repulsion from the opposite charge mostly cancel each other out.

Even though electromagnetism is far stronger than gravitation, electrostatic attraction is not relevant for large celestial bodies, such as planets, stars, and galaxies, simply because such bodies contain roughly equal numbers of protons and electrons and so have a net electric charge of zero. Nothing "cancels" gravity, since it is only attractive, unlike electric forces which can be attractive or repulsive. On the other hand, all objects having mass are subject to the gravitational force, which only attracts. Therefore, only gravitation matters on the large-scale structure of the universe.

The long range of gravitation makes it responsible for such large-scale phenomena as the structure of galaxies and black holes and, being only attractive, it slows down the expansion of the universe. Gravitation also explains astronomical phenomena on more modest scales, such as planetary orbits, as well as everyday experience: objects fall; heavy objects act as if they were glued to the ground, and animals can only jump so high.

Gravitation was the first interaction to be described mathematically. In ancient times, Aristotle hypothesized that objects of different masses fall at different rates. During the Scientific Revolution, Galileo Galilei experimentally determined that this hypothesis was wrong under certain circumstances—neglecting the friction due to air resistance and buoyancy forces if an atmosphere is present (e.g. the case of a dropped air-filled balloon vs a water-filled balloon), all objects accelerate toward the Earth at the same rate. Isaac Newton's law of Universal Gravitation (1687) was a good approximation of the behaviour of gravitation. Present-day understanding of gravitation stems from Einstein's General Theory of Relativity of 1915, a more accurate (especially for cosmological masses and distances) description of gravitation in terms of the geometry of spacetime.

Merging general relativity and quantum mechanics (or quantum field theory) into a more general theory of quantum gravity is an area of active research. It is hypothesized that gravitation is mediated by a massless spin-2 particle called the graviton.

Although general relativity has been experimentally confirmed (at least for weak fields, i.e. not black holes) on all but the smallest scales, there are alternatives to general relativity. These theories must reduce to general relativity in some limit, and the focus of observational work is to establish limits on what deviations from general relativity are possible.

Proposed extra dimensions could explain why the gravity force is so weak.

=== Electroweak interaction ===
Electromagnetism and weak interaction appear to be very different at everyday low energies. They can be modeled using two different theories. However, above unification energy, on the order of 100 GeV, they would merge into a single electroweak force.

The electroweak theory is very important for modern cosmology, particularly on how the universe evolved. This is because shortly after the Big Bang, when the temperature was still above approximately 10^{15} K, the electromagnetic force and the weak force were still merged as a combined electroweak force.

For contributions to the unification of the weak and electromagnetic interaction between elementary particles, Abdus Salam, Sheldon Glashow and Steven Weinberg were awarded the Nobel Prize in Physics in 1979.

==== Electromagnetism ====
Electromagnetism is the force that acts between electrically charged particles. This phenomenon includes the electrostatic force acting between charged particles at rest, and the combined effect of electric and magnetic forces acting between charged particles moving relative to each other.

Electromagnetism has an infinite range, as gravity does, but is vastly stronger. It is the force that binds electrons to atoms, and it holds molecules together. It is responsible for everyday phenomena like light, magnets, electricity, and friction. Electromagnetism fundamentally determines all macroscopic, and many atomic-level, properties of the chemical elements.

In a four kilogram (~1 gallon) jug of water, there is
$$4000 \ \mbox{g}\,\rm{H}_2 \rm{O} \cdot \frac{1 \ \mbox{mol}\,\rm{H}_2 \rm{O}}{18 \ \mbox{g}\,H_2 O} \cdot \frac{10 \ \mbox{mol}\,e^{-}}{1 \ \mbox{mol}\,H_2 O} \cdot \frac{96,000 \ \mbox{C}\,}{1 \ \mbox{mol}\,e^{-}} = 2.1 \times 10^{8} C \ \, \$$
of total electron charge. Thus, if we place two such jugs a meter apart, the electrons in one of the jugs repel those in the other jug with a force of
$${1 \over 4\pi\varepsilon_0}\frac{(2.1 \times 10^{8} \mathrm{C})^2}{(1 m)^2} = 4.1 \times 10^{26} \mathrm{N}.$$
This force is many times larger than the weight of the planet Earth. The atomic nuclei in one jug also repel those in the other with the same force. However, these repulsive forces are canceled by the attraction of the electrons in jug A with the nuclei in jug B and the attraction of the nuclei in jug A with the electrons in jug B, resulting in no net force. Electromagnetic forces are tremendously stronger than gravity, but tend to cancel out so that for astronomical-scale bodies, gravity dominates.

Electrical and magnetic phenomena have been observed since ancient times, but it was only in the 19th century James Clerk Maxwell discovered that electricity and magnetism are two aspects of the same fundamental interaction. By 1864, Maxwell's equations had rigorously quantified this unified interaction. Maxwell's theory, restated using vector calculus, is the classical theory of electromagnetism, suitable for most technological purposes.

The constant speed of light in vacuum (customarily denoted with a lowercase letter c) can be derived from Maxwell's equations, which are consistent with the theory of special relativity. Albert Einstein's 1905 theory of special relativity, however, which follows from the observation that the speed of light is constant no matter how fast the observer is moving, showed that the theoretical result implied by Maxwell's equations has profound implications far beyond electromagnetism on the very nature of time and space.

In another work that departed from classical electro-magnetism, Einstein also explained the photoelectric effect by utilizing Max Planck's discovery that light was transmitted in 'quanta' of specific energy content based on the frequency, which we now call photons. Starting around 1927, Paul Dirac combined quantum mechanics with the relativistic theory of electromagnetism. Further work in the 1940s, by Richard Feynman, Freeman Dyson, Julian Schwinger, and Sin-Itiro Tomonaga, completed this theory, which is now called quantum electrodynamics, the revised theory of electromagnetism. Quantum electrodynamics and quantum mechanics provide a theoretical basis for electromagnetic behavior such as quantum tunneling, in which a certain percentage of electrically charged particles move in ways that would be impossible under the classical electromagnetic theory, that is necessary for everyday electronic devices such as transistors to function.

==== Weak interaction ====
The weak interaction or weak nuclear force is responsible for some nuclear phenomena such as beta decay. Electromagnetism and the weak force are now understood to be two aspects of a unified electroweak interaction — this discovery was the first step toward the unified theory known as the Standard Model. In the theory of the electroweak interaction, the carriers of the weak force are the massive gauge bosons called the W and Z bosons. The weak interaction is the only known interaction that does not conserve parity; it is left–right asymmetric. The weak interaction even violates CP symmetry but does conserve CPT.

=== Strong interaction ===
The strong interaction, or strong nuclear force, is the most complicated interaction, mainly because of the way it varies with distance. The nuclear force is powerfully attractive between nucleons at distances of about 1 femtometre (fm, or 10^{−15} metres), but it rapidly decreases to insignificance at distances beyond about 2.5 fm. At distances less than 0.7 fm, the nuclear force becomes repulsive. This repulsive component is responsible for the physical size of nuclei, since the nucleons can come no closer than the force allows.

After the nucleus was discovered in 1908, it was clear that a new force, today known as the nuclear force, was needed to overcome the electrostatic repulsion, a manifestation of electromagnetism, of the positively charged protons. Otherwise, the nucleus could not exist. Moreover, the force had to be strong enough to squeeze the protons into a volume whose diameter is about 10^{−15} m, much smaller than that of the entire atom. From the short range of this force, Hideki Yukawa predicted that it was associated with a massive force particle, whose mass is approximately 100 MeV.

The 1947 discovery of the pion ushered in the modern era of particle physics. Hundreds of hadrons were discovered from the 1940s to 1960s, and an extremely complicated theory of hadrons as strongly interacting particles was developed. Most notably:

- The pions were understood to be oscillations of vacuum condensates;
- Jun John Sakurai proposed the rho and omega vector bosons to be force carrying particles for approximate symmetries of isospin and hypercharge;
- Geoffrey Chew, Edward K. Burdett and Steven Frautschi grouped the heavier hadrons into families that could be understood as vibrational and rotational excitations of strings.

While each of these approaches offered insights, no approach led directly to a fundamental theory.

Murray Gell-Mann along with George Zweig first proposed fractionally charged quarks in 1961. Throughout the 1960s, different authors considered theories similar to the modern fundamental theory of quantum chromodynamics (QCD) as simple models for the interactions of quarks. The first to hypothesize the gluons of QCD were Moo-Young Han and Yoichiro Nambu, who introduced the quark color charge. Han and Nambu hypothesized that it might be associated with a force-carrying field. At that time, however, it was difficult to see how such a model could permanently confine quarks. Han and Nambu also assigned each quark color an integer electrical charge, so that the quarks were fractionally charged only on average, and they did not expect the quarks in their model to be permanently confined.

In 1971, Murray Gell-Mann and Harald Fritzsch proposed that the Han/Nambu color gauge field was the correct theory of the short-distance interactions of fractionally charged quarks. A little later, David Gross, Frank Wilczek, and David Politzer discovered that this theory had the property of asymptotic freedom, allowing them to make contact with experimental evidence. They concluded that QCD was the complete theory of the strong interactions, correct at all distance scales. The discovery of asymptotic freedom led most physicists to accept QCD since it became clear that even the long-distance properties of the strong interactions could be consistent with experiment if the quarks are permanently confined: the strong force increases indefinitely with distance, trapping quarks inside the hadrons.

Assuming that quarks are confined, Mikhail Shifman, Arkady Vainshtein and Valentine Zakharov were able to compute the properties of many low-lying hadrons directly from QCD, with only a few extra parameters to describe the vacuum. In 1980, Kenneth G. Wilson published computer calculations based on the first principles of QCD, establishing, to a level of confidence tantamount to certainty, that QCD will confine quarks. Since then, QCD has been the established theory of strong interactions.

QCD is a theory of fractionally charged quarks interacting by means of 8 bosonic particles called gluons. The gluons also interact with each other, not just with the quarks, and at long distances the lines of force collimate into strings, loosely modeled by a linear potential, a constant attractive force. In this way, the mathematical theory of QCD not only explains how quarks interact over short distances but also the string-like behavior, discovered by Chew and Frautschi, which they manifest over longer distances.

=== Higgs interaction ===
Conventionally, the Higgs interaction is not counted among the four fundamental forces.

Nonetheless, although not a gauge interaction nor generated by any diffeomorphism symmetry, the Higgs field's cubic Yukawa coupling produces a weakly attractive fifth interaction. After spontaneous symmetry breaking via the Higgs mechanism, Yukawa terms remain of the form
$$\frac{\lambda_i}{\sqrt 2} \bar{\psi} \phi' \psi = \frac{m_i}{\nu} \bar{\psi} \phi' \psi,$$
with Yukawa coupling $\lambda_i$, particle mass $m_i$ (in eV), and Higgs vacuum expectation value 246.22 GeV. Hence coupled particles can exchange a virtual Higgs boson, yielding classical potentials of the form
$$V(r) = - \frac{m_i m_j}{m_{\rm H}^2} \frac{1}{4\pi r} e^{-m_{\rm H}\, c\, r/\hbar},$$
with Higgs mass 125.18 GeV. Because the reduced Compton wavelength of the Higgs boson is so small (1.576×10^{−18} m, comparable to the W and Z bosons), this potential has an effective range of a few attometers. Between two electrons, it begins roughly 10^{11} times weaker than the weak interaction, and grows exponentially weaker at non-zero distances.

== Unification ==
The fundamental forces may become unified into a single force at very high energies and on a minuscule scale, the Planck scale. Particle accelerators cannot produce the enormous energies required to experimentally probe this regime. The weak and electromagnetic forces have already been unified with the electroweak theory of Sheldon Glashow, Abdus Salam, and Steven Weinberg, for which they received the 1979 Nobel Prize in physics. Numerous theoretical efforts have been made to systematize the existing four fundamental interactions on the model of electroweak unification.

Grand Unified Theories (GUTs) are proposals to show that each of the three fundamental interactions described by the Standard Model is a different manifestation of a single interaction with symmetries that break down and create separate interactions below some extremely high level of energy. GUTs are also expected to predict some of the relationships between constants of nature that the Standard Model treats as unrelated and gauge coupling unification for the relative strengths of the electromagnetic, weak, and strong forces. Some attempts at GUTs hypothesize "shadow" particles, such that every known matter particle associates with an undiscovered force particle, and vice versa, altogether supersymmetry (SUSY). Other theorists seek to quantize the gravitational field by the modelling behaviour of its hypothetical force carrier, the graviton and achieve quantum gravity (QG). One approach to QG is loop quantum gravity (LQG). Still other theorists seek both QG and GUT within one framework, reducing all four fundamental interactions to a Theory of Everything (ToE). The most prevalent aim at a ToE is string theory, although to model matter particles, it added SUSY to force particles—and so, strictly speaking, became superstring theory. Multiple, seemingly disparate superstring theories were unified on a backbone, M-theory. Theories beyond the Standard Model remain highly speculative, lacking great experimental support.

A so-called theory of everything, which would integrate GUTs with a quantum gravity theory, faces a greater barrier because no quantum gravity theory (e.g., string theory, loop quantum gravity, and twistor theory) has secured wide acceptance. Some theories look for a graviton to complete the Standard Model list of force-carrying particles, while others, like loop quantum gravity, emphasize the possibility that time-space itself may have a quantum aspect to it.

== Beyond the Standard Model ==
Some theories beyond the Standard Model include a hypothetical fifth force, and the search for such a force is an ongoing line of experimental physics research. In supersymmetric theories, some particles, known as moduli, acquire their masses only through supersymmetry breaking effects and can mediate new forces. Another reason to look for new forces is the discovery that the expansion of the universe is accelerating (also known as dark energy), creating a need to explain a nonzero cosmological constant and possibly other modifications of general relativity. Fifth forces have also been suggested to explain phenomena such as CP violations, dark matter, and dark flow.

== See also ==
- Quintessence, a hypothesized fifth force
- Gerardus 't Hooft
- Edward Witten
- Howard Georgi

== Bibliography ==
- Davies, Paul (1986), The Forces of Nature, Cambridge Univ. Press 2nd ed.
- Feynman, Richard (1967), The Character of Physical Law, MIT Press, ISBN 978-0-262-56003-0
- Schumm, Bruce A. (2004), Deep Down Things, Johns Hopkins University Press While all interactions are discussed, discussion is especially thorough on the weak.
- Weinberg, Steven (1993), The First Three Minutes: A Modern View of the Origin of the Universe, Basic Books, ISBN 978-0-465-02437-7
- Weinberg, Steven (1994), Dreams of a Final Theory, Basic Books, ISBN 978-0-679-74408-5
- Padmanabhan, T. (1998), After The First Three Minutes: The Story of Our Universe, Cambridge Univ. Press, ISBN 978-0-521-62972-0
- Perkins, Donald H. (2000), Introduction to High Energy Physics (4th ed.), Cambridge Univ. Press, ISBN 978-0-521-62196-0
- Riazuddin (December 29, 2009). "Non-standard interactions" (PDF). NCP 5th Particle Physics Sypnoisis. 1 (1): 1–25. Archived from the original (PDF) on March 3, 2016.
