= ZZ diboson =

ZZ dibosons are rare pairs of Z bosons. They were first observed by the experiments at the Large Electron–Positron Collider (ALEPH, DELPHI, L3 and OPAL). The first observation in a hadron collider was made by the scientists of DØ collaboration at Fermilab.

== Discussion ==
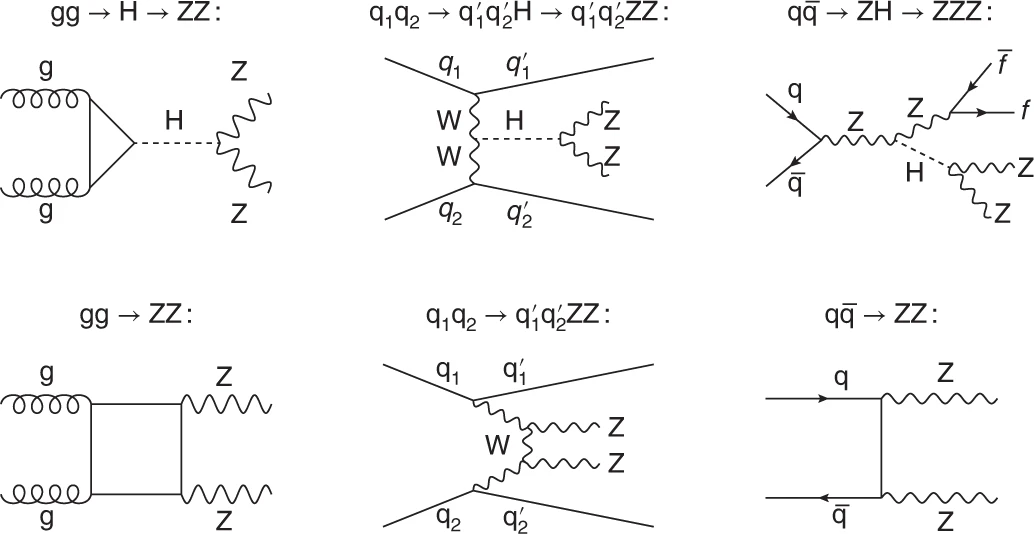
Feynman diagrams for important contributions to ZZ production. Diagrams can be distinguished as those involving the H boson (top) and those that give rise to continuum-ZZ production (bottom), which interact destructively with each other.

ZZ dibosons are force-carrying particles observed as products of proton–antiproton collisions at the Tevatron, the world's second highest-energy particle accelerator (after the CERN Large Hadron Collider). The first observation of the ZZ dibosons was announced at a Fermilab seminar on 30 July 2008.

The rarest diboson processes after ZZ dibosons are those involving the Higgs boson, so seeing ZZ diboson is an essential step in demonstrating the ability to see the Higgs boson. ZZ dibosons are the latest in a series of observations of pairs of gauge bosons (force-carrying particles) by DØ and its sister experiment CDF (also at Tevatron).

Final analysis of the data for this discovery was done by a team of international researchers including scientists of American, Belgian, British, Georgian, Italian, and Russian nationalities. The observations began with the study of the already-rare production of W bosons plus photons (W^{±} + γ); then Z bosons plus photons (Z^{0} + γ); then observation of W pairs (W^{±} + W^{∓}); then a mix of W and Z boson (W^{±} + Z^{0}). The ZZ (Z^{0} + Z^{0}) is the combination that has the lowest predicted likelihood of production in the Standard Model due to the smaller couplings.

== See also ==
- Dineutron
- Diproton
- Pauli exclusion principle
- Higgs boson
- List of particles
