= MATHUSLA =

MATHUSLA (MAssive Timing Hodoscope for Ultra-Stable neutraL pArticles) is a proposed experiment at CERN's Large Hadron Collider (LHC). It is a dedicated large-volume detector on the surface above CMS for exotic long-lived particles (LLPs) produced in LHC collisions, which can travel to the surface and decay into charged particles inside its decay volume. MATHUSLA is motivated by the fact that LLPs could easily escape detection in the existing LHC experiments (the ATLAS experiment, CMS and LHCb), but their existence could explain major outstanding questions in particle physics, like possibly the hierarchy problem, dark matter, baryogenesis or the masses of neutrinos. MATHUSLA's location on the surface, shielded from the radiation of LHC collisions that can obfuscate LLP signals, as well as its large detection volume allows it to fill this capability gap and detect LLPs with very long lifetimes up to the ~0.1 second upper limit imposed by Big Bang nucleosynthesis.

The project is supported by an international collaboration and is in the technical development phase, with operations planned to start in the mid-to-late 2020s.
