= Rohini Godbole =

Indian physicist (1952–2024)

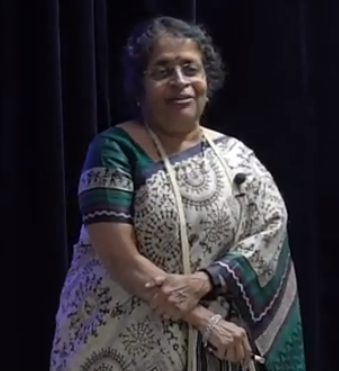
- Godbole in 2017
- Born: 12 November 1952; Pune, Bombay State, India
- Died: 25 October 2024 (aged 71); Bangalore, Karnataka, India
- Citizenship: Indian
- Education: University of Pune; IIT Bombay; Stony Brook University
- Awards: National Order of Merit Padma Shri (2019), Government of India IIT Bombay, 1974 Batch, Silver medallist
- Scientific career
- Fields: Particle Physics
- Website: http://rmgodbole.in/

Rohini Godbole (12 November 1952 – 25 October 2024) was an Indian physicist and academic specializing in elementary particle physics: field theory and phenomenology. She was professor at the Centre for High Energy Physics, Indian Institute of Science, Bangalore. She worked extensively on different aspects of particle phenomenology over three decades, in particular on exploring different aspects of the Standard Model of Particle Physics (SM) and the physics beyond it (BSM). Her work regarding hadronic structure of high-energy photons outlined a variety of ways in which to study it and has had implications for the design of next generation electron positron colliders. She was an elected fellow of all the three academies of Science of India and also the Science Academy of the Developing World (TWAS).

Apart from her work in academics, Godbole was also a much sought-after communicator of science, often delivering talks to young students, scholars and scientists on everything physics. She was also an avid supporter of women pursuing careers in science and technology, and along with Ram Ramaswamy, edited the book Lilavati's Daughters, a collection of biographical essays on women scientists from India.

== Life and career ==
Godbole was born in Pune, in the Indian state of Maharashtra in 1952. She graduated with a bachelor's degree in physics, mathematics and statistics from Sir Parshurambhau College, University of Pune, and later obtained a masters in science degree from the Indian Institute of Technology, Bombay. She completed here PhD in theoretical particle physics from the State University of New York at Stony Brook.

Godbole joined Tata Institute of Fundamental Research, Mumbai as a visiting fellow in 1979. She was Lecturer and Reader at the Department of Physics, University of Bombay from 1982 to 1995. She joined the Centre for High Energy Physics, Indian Institute of Science, Bangalore, as an associate professor in 1995 and has been a professor since June 1998. Superannuating there by 31 July 2021, she became an honorary professor.

She authored more than 150 research papers, many of which have some of the largest citation indices in her area.

Godbole died on 25 October 2024 at her home in Bangalore from a short-illness at the age of 71.

== Research fields ==
Godbole worked in the following areas-

- New Particle Production at current and future colliders
- Physics at Large Hadron Collider and Next Linear Collider
- QCD phenomenology: Structure Functions of a proton, photon and nucleus
- Supersymmetry and Electroweak Physics

== Contribution ==
Godbole was part of the International Detector Advisory Group (IDAG) for the International Linear Collider in the European research lab, CERN. The International Detector Advisory Group monitors the ILC detector research and development of the Research Directorate and the detector design groups. She was the Chair of the Panel for Women in Science initiative of the Indian Academy of Sciences. Along with Ram Ramaswamy, Godbole jointly edited Lilavati's Daughters, a collection of biographical essays on women scientists of India, which was published in the form of book by Indian Academy of Sciences in 2008.

== Publications ==
- Low-virtuality leptoproduction of open-charm as a probe of the gluon Sivers function (2018)
- Transverse single-spin asymmetry in the low-virtuality leptoproduction of open charm as a probe of the gluon Sivers function (2017)
- Proceedings, 2nd Asia-Europe-Pacific School of High-Energy Physics (AEPSHEP 2014) : Puri, India (2014)

== Books ==
- Theory And Phenomenology Of Sparticles: An Account Of Four-dimensional N=1 Supersymmetry In High Energy Physics: Supersymmetry or SUSY, one of the most beautiful recent ideas of physics, predicts sparticles existing as superpartners of particles. This book gives a theoretical and phenomenological account of sparticles. Starting from a basic level, it provides a comprehensive, pedagogical and user-friendly treatment of the subject of four-dimensional N=1 supersymmetry as well as its observational aspects in high energy physics and cosmology.
- The Girl's Guide to a Life in Science: Inspiring, informative, ingenious...meet twenty-five of India's most celebrated female scientists. From astrophysics to zoology, learn what it takes to make a career in science. Who were they encouraged by? What did they struggle against? What motivated them to choose their particular field? What are the key questions at the cutting edge of modern research? What are the Big Questions that they are striving to find answers for? Why chose a life in science at all? Each of the women in this essential guide gives a short overview of their life and career. The profiles are accompanied by "Know-it-ology"—a brief introduction to their particular field of research. Each of the scientists describes her own "Eureka Moment".
- LILAVATI'S DAUGHTERS- The Women Scientists of India (2008)

== Awards ==
- Honorary doctorate, IIT Kanpur (2021).
- Padma Shri for her contributions in science and technology (2019).
- Satyendranath Bose Medal of Indian National Science Academy (2009)
- Fellowship of National Academy of Sciences, India (NASI) (2007)
- Fellowship of Academy of Sciences of the Developing World, TWAS 2009
- Devi Award of the New Indian Express Group, August 2015.
- Ordre National du Mérite by the French government.

== Sources ==
- Autobiographical article by Rohini Godbole in Lilavati's Daughters
