= Lilavati's Daughters =

2008 essay collection on Indian women scientists

Lilavati's Daughters - The Women Scientists of India
- Editors: Rohini Godbole and Ram Ramaswamy
- Cover artist: Trinankur Banerjee
- Language: English
- Genre: Biography; Women in science
- Publisher: Indian Academy of Sciences
- Publication date: 2008 (pbk)
- Publication place: India
- Media type: Print (paperback)
- Pages: 368 pp. (pbk)
- ISBN: 9788184650051
- OCLC: 458284313

Lilavati's Daughters is a collection of nearly one hundred biographical essays on women scientists of India. Published by the Indian Academy of Sciences (Bangalore) in 2008, the book was edited by Rohini Godbole and Ram Ramaswamy. Reviews have appeared in The Hindu, Nature and C&E News, among other places. The book contains brief biographical and autobiographical sketches of women scientists working in India. Covering a range of disciplines, in these essays the scientists talk of what brought them to science, what kept their interest alive, and what has helped them achieve some measure of distinction in their careers. This collection represents the cultural diversity of the country as well as a diverse range of disciplines, so that any student could gain from the insights and experiences of professional women to whom they may be able to relate at many levels.

The title of the collection is a nod to the 12th-century treatise, Lilavati, written by the Indian mathematician Bhāskara II wherein problems in arithmetic, algebra, geometry, etc. are discussed via poetic conversations addressed to his daughter Lilavati.

The book has been translated in Malayalam as "Leelavatiyude Pennmakkal", published by the Kerala Sasthra Sahithya Parishath. A shorter (and different) version of Lilavati's Daughters was brought out as "The Girl's Guide to a Life in Science", edited by Ram Ramaswamy, Rohini Godbole and Mandakini Dubey (co-published with Young Zubaan, New Delhi). This is also an initiative of the Women in Science (WiS) Panel of the Indian Academy of Sciences, Bangalore.

== Contents ==
There are short biographies of the botanist E. K. Janaki Ammal, the chemists Asima Chatterjee and Darshan Ranganathan, India's first female physician Anandibai Joshee, the anthropologist Iravati Karve, the biochemist Kamala Sohonie, the medical researcher Kamal Ranadive, physicist B. Vijayalakshmi and meteorologist Anna Mani. Autobiographical sketches by a number of distinguished scientists, many of who are currently working in India complete the book. Further details can be found on the Indian Academy of Sciences website.

The book presents stories of women scientists who have conducted significant research and have won awards such as the Padma Shri, the Padma Bhushan, the Shanti Swaroop Bhatnagar Award, the C. V. Raman Award, and other national and international awards. It features female scientists who have been heads of research institutes and have been nominated as Fellows of National Academy of Sciences.
