= Weak interaction =

Interaction between subatomic particles

The radioactive beta decay is due to the weak interaction, which transforms a neutron into a proton, an electron, and an electron antineutrino.

In nuclear physics and particle physics, the weak interaction, weak force or weak nuclear force, is one of the four known fundamental interactions, with the others being electromagnetism, the strong interaction, and gravitation. It is the mechanism of interaction between subatomic particles that is responsible for the radioactive beta decay of atoms: The weak interaction participates in nuclear fission and nuclear fusion. The theory describing its behaviour and effects is sometimes called quantum flavourdynamics or electroweak theory.

The effective range of the weak force is limited to subatomic distances and is less than the diameter of a proton.

First suggested in 1933, the theory behind the weak force reached its current form in the 1950s and 1960s. The force has three carriers, the W^{+}, W^{−}, and Z bosons, which were not discovered until 1983.

== Background ==
The Standard Model of particle physics provides a uniform framework for understanding electromagnetic, weak, and strong interactions. An interaction occurs when two particles (typically, but not necessarily, half-integer spin fermions) exchange integer-spin, force-carrying bosons. The fermions involved in such exchanges can be either elementary (e.g., electrons or quarks) or composite (e.g., protons or neutrons), although at the deepest levels, all weak interactions ultimately are between elementary particles.

== Properties ==
In the weak interaction, fermions can exchange three types of force carriers, namely W^{+}, W^{−}, and Z bosons. The masses of these bosons are far greater than the mass of a proton or neutron, which is consistent with the short range of the weak force. In fact, the force is termed weak because its field strength over any set distance is typically several orders of magnitude less than that of the electromagnetic force, which itself is further orders of magnitude less than the strong nuclear force.

The weak interaction is the only fundamental interaction that breaks parity symmetry, and similarly, but far more rarely, the only interaction to break charge–parity symmetry.

Quarks, which make up composite particles like neutrons and protons, come in six "flavours" – up, down, charm, strange, top, and bottom – which give those composite particles their properties. The weak interaction is unique in that it allows quarks to swap their flavour for another. The swapping of those properties is mediated by the force-carrier bosons. For example, during beta-minus decay, a down quark within a neutron is changed into an up quark, thus converting the neutron to a proton and resulting in the emission of an electron and an electron antineutrino.

Weak interaction is important in the fusion of hydrogen into helium in a star. This is because it can convert a proton (hydrogen) into a neutron that can fuse with another proton to form deuterium, which is important for the continuation of nuclear fusion to form helium. The accumulation of neutrons facilitates the buildup of heavy nuclei in a star.

The electroweak force is believed to have separated into the electromagnetic and weak forces during the quark epoch of the early universe.

A diagram depicting the decay routes for the six quarks due to the charged weak interaction and some indication of their likelihood. The intensity of the lines is given by the CKM parameters.

The weak interaction is unique in several respects:

- It is the only interaction that can change the flavour of quarks and leptons (i.e., change one type of quark into another).
- It is the only interaction that violates P, or parity symmetry. It is also the only one that violates charge–parity (CP) symmetry.
- Both the electrically charged and the electrically neutral interactions are mediated (propagated) by force carrier particles that have significant masses, an unusual feature which is explained in the Standard Model by the Higgs mechanism.
- Decay processes like beta decay governed by the weak interaction can only be observed when processes involving faster decays via electromagnetic or strong interaction are not competing.

Due to their large mass (approximately 90 GeV/c^{2}) these carrier particles, called the W and Z bosons, are short-lived with a lifetime of under 10^{−24} seconds. The weak interaction has a coupling constant (an indicator of how frequently interactions occur) between 10^{−7} and 10^{−6}, compared to the electromagnetic coupling constant of about 10^{−2} and the strong interaction coupling constant of about 1; consequently the weak interaction is "weak" in terms of intensity. The weak interaction has a very short effective range (around 10^{−17} to 10^{−16} m (0.01 to 0.1 fm)). (Note: Compare to a proton charge radius of 8.3×10^{−16} m ~ 0.83 fm.) At distances around 10^{−18} meters (0.001 fm), the weak interaction has an intensity of a similar magnitude to the electromagnetic force, but this starts to decrease exponentially with increasing distance. Scaled up by just one and a half orders of magnitude, at distances of around 3×10^{−17} m, the weak interaction becomes 10,000 times weaker.

The weak interaction affects all the fermions of the Standard Model, as well as the Higgs boson; neutrinos interact only through gravity and the weak interaction. The weak interaction does not produce bound states, nor does it involve binding energy – something that gravity does on an astronomical scale, the electromagnetic force does at the molecular and atomic levels, and the strong nuclear force does only at the subatomic level, inside of nuclei.

Its most noticeable effect is due to its first unique feature: The charged weak interaction causes flavour change. For example, a neutron is heavier than a proton (its partner nucleon) and can decay into a proton by changing the flavour (type) of one of its two down quarks to an up quark. Neither the strong interaction nor electromagnetism permit flavour changing, so this can only proceed by weak decay; without weak decay, quark properties such as strangeness and charm (associated with the strange quark and charm quark, respectively) would also be conserved across all interactions.

All mesons are unstable because of weak decay. (Note: The neutral pion (π^{0}), however, decays electromagnetically, and several other mesons (when their quantum numbers permit) mostly decay via a strong interaction.) In the process known as beta decay, a down quark in the neutron can change into an up quark by emitting a virtual W^{−} boson, which then decays into an electron and an electron antineutrino. Another example is electron capture – a common variant of radioactive decay – wherein a proton and an electron within an atom interact and are changed to a neutron (an up quark is changed to a down quark), and an electron neutrino is emitted.

Weak decay makes radiocarbon dating possible, as carbon-14 decays through the weak interaction to nitrogen-14. It can also create radioluminescence, commonly used in tritium luminescence, and in the related field of betavoltaics (but not similar to radium luminescence).

Due to the large masses of the W bosons, particle transformations or decays (e.g., flavour change) that depend on the weak interaction typically occur much more slowly than transformations or decays that depend only on the strong or electromagnetic forces. (Note: The prominent and possibly unique exception to this rule is the decay of the top quark, whose mass exceeds the combined masses of the bottom quark and W^{+} boson that it decays into, hence it has a no energy constraint slowing its transition. Its unique speed of decay by the weak force is much higher than the speed with which the strong interaction (or "color force") can bind it to other quarks.) For example, a neutral pion decays electromagnetically, and so has a life of only about 10^{−16} seconds. In contrast, a charged pion can only decay through the weak interaction, and so lives about 10^{−8} seconds, or a hundred million times longer than a neutral pion. A particularly extreme example is the weak-force decay of a free neutron, which takes about 15 minutes.

=== Weak isospin and weak hypercharge ===
Left-handed fermions in the Standard Model
Generation 1			Generation 2			Generation 3		
Fermion	Symbol	Weak isospin	Fermion	Symbol	Weak isospin	Fermion	Symbol	Weak isospin
electron neutrino	ν_{e}	+ 1/2	muon neutrino	ν_{μ}	+ 1/2	tau neutrino	ν_{τ}	+ 1/2
electron	e^{−}	− 1/2	muon	μ^{−}	− 1/2	tau	τ^{−}	− 1/2
up quark	u	+ 1/2	charm quark	c	+ 1/2	top quark	t	+ 1/2
down quark	d	− 1/2	strange quark	s	− 1/2	bottom quark	b	− 1/2
All of the above left-handed (regular) particles have corresponding right-handed anti-particles with equal and opposite weak isospin.
All right-handed (regular) particles and left-handed antiparticles have weak isospin of 0.

All particles have a property called weak isospin (symbol T_{3}), which serves as an additive quantum number that restricts how the particle can interact with the W^{±} of the weak force. Weak isospin plays the same role in the weak interaction with W^{±} as electric charge does in electromagnetism, and color charge in the strong interaction; a different number with a similar name, weak charge, discussed below, is used for interactions with the Z^{0}. All left-handed fermions have a weak isospin value of either + 1/2 or − 1/2; all right-handed fermions have 0 isospin. For example, the up quark has T_{3} = + 1/2 and the down quark has T_{3} = − 1/2. A quark never decays through the weak interaction into a quark of the same T_{3}: Quarks with a T_{3} of + 1/2 only decay into quarks with a T_{3} of − 1/2 and conversely.

π^{+} decay through the weak interaction

In any given strong, electromagnetic, or weak interaction, weak isospin is conserved: (Note: Only interactions with the Higgs boson violate conservation of weak isospin, and appear to always do so maximally: $\bigl| \Delta T_3 \bigr| = \tfrac{1}{2}\ .$) The sum of the weak isospin numbers of the particles entering the interaction equals the sum of the weak isospin numbers of the particles exiting that interaction. For example, a (left-handed) π^{+}, with a weak isospin of +1 normally decays into a ν_{μ} (with T_{3} = + 1/2) and a μ^{+} (as a right-handed antiparticle, + 1/2).

For the development of the electroweak theory, another property, weak hypercharge, was invented, defined as
$$Y_\text{W} = 2\,(Q - T_3),$$
where Y_{W} is the weak hypercharge of a particle with electrical charge Q (in elementary charge units) and weak isospin T_{3}. Weak hypercharge is the generator of the U(1) component of the electroweak gauge group; whereas some particles have a weak isospin of zero, all known spin-1/2 particles have a non-zero weak hypercharge. (Note: Some hypothesised fermions, such as the sterile neutrinos, would have zero weak hypercharge – in fact, no gauge charges of any known kind. Whether any such particles actually exist is an active area of research.)

== Classification ==
Weak interactions between leptons are called leptonic; between quarks are called non-leptonic; between quarks and leptons are called semi-leptonic. All leptons have identical coupling to the force mediating Z and W bosons. Coupling to quarks depends upon the quark flavour.

== Interaction types ==
There are two types of weak interaction (called vertices). The first type is called the "charged-current interaction" because the weakly interacting fermions form a current with total electric charge that is nonzero. The second type is called the "neutral-current interaction" because the weakly interacting fermions form a current with total electric charge of zero. It is responsible for the (rare) deflection of neutrinos. The two types of interaction follow different selection rules. This naming convention is often misunderstood to label the electric charge of the W and Z bosons, however the naming convention predates the concept of the mediator bosons, and clearly (at least in name) labels the charge of the current (formed from the fermions), not necessarily the bosons. (Note: The exchange of a virtual W boson can be equally well thought of as (say) the emission of a W^{+} or the absorption of a W^{−}; that is, for time on the vertical co‑ordinate axis, as a W^{+} from left to right, or equivalently as a W^{−} from right to left.)

=== Charged-current interaction ===
The Feynman diagram for beta-minus decay of a neutron (n = udd) into a proton (p = udu), electron (e^{−}), and electron anti-neutrino , via a charged vector boson (W^{−}).

In one type of charged current interaction, a charged lepton (such as an electron or a muon, having a charge of −1) can absorb a W^{+} boson (a particle with a charge of +1) and be thereby converted into a corresponding neutrino (with a charge of 0), where the type ("flavour") of neutrino (electron ν_{e}, muon ν_{μ}, or tau ν_{τ}) is the same as the type of lepton in the interaction, for example:
$$\mu^- + \mathrm{W}^+ \to \nu_\mu$$
Similarly, a down-type quark (d, s, or b, with a charge of − 1/3) can be converted into an up-type quark (u, c, or t, with a charge of + 2/3), by emitting a W^{−} boson or by absorbing a W^{+} boson. More precisely, the down-type quark becomes a quantum superposition of up-type quarks: that is to say, it has a possibility of becoming any one of the three up-type quarks, with the probabilities given in the CKM matrix tables. Conversely, an up-type quark can emit a W^{+} boson, or absorb a W^{−} boson, and thereby be converted into a down-type quark, for example:
$$\begin{align}
\mathrm{d} &\to \mathrm{u} + \mathrm{W}^- \\
\mathrm{d} + \mathrm{W}^+ &\to \mathrm{u} \\
\mathrm{c} &\to \mathrm{s} + \mathrm{W}^+ \\
\mathrm{c} + \mathrm{W}^- &\to \mathrm{s}
\end{align}$$

The W boson is unstable so will rapidly decay, with a very short lifetime. For example:
$$\begin{align}
\mathrm{W}^- &\to \mathrm{e}^- + \bar\nu_\mathrm{e} ~ \\
\mathrm{W}^+ &\to \mathrm{e}^+ + \nu_\mathrm{e} ~
\end{align}$$

Decay of a W boson to other products can happen, with varying probabilities.

In the so-called beta decay of a neutron (see picture, above), a down quark within the neutron emits a virtual W^{−} boson and is thereby converted into an up quark, converting the neutron into a proton. Because of the limited energy involved in the process (i.e., the mass difference between the down quark and the up quark), the virtual W^{−} boson can only carry sufficient energy to produce an electron and an electron antineutrino – the two lowest-possible masses among its prospective decay products. At the quark level, the process can be represented as:
$$\mathrm{d} \to \mathrm{u} + \mathrm{e}^- + \bar\nu_\mathrm{e} ~$$

=== Neutral-current interaction ===
In neutral current interactions, a quark or a lepton (e.g., an electron or a muon) emits or absorbs a neutral Z boson. For example:
$$\mathrm{e}^- \to \mathrm{e}^- + \mathrm{Z}^0$$

Like the W^{±} bosons, the Z^{0} boson also decays rapidly, for example:
$$\mathrm{Z}^0 \to \mathrm{b} + \bar \mathrm{b}$$

Unlike the charged-current interaction, whose selection rules are strictly limited by chirality, electric charge, and / or weak isospin, the neutral-current Z^{0} interaction can cause any two fermions in the standard model to deflect: Either particles or anti-particles, with any electric charge, and both left- and right-chirality, although the strength of the interaction differs. (Note: The only fermions which the Z^{0} does not interact with at all are the hypothetical "sterile" neutrinos: Left-chiral anti-neutrinos and right-chiral neutrinos. They are called "sterile" because they would not interact with any Standard Model particle, except perhaps the Higgs boson. So far they remain entirely a conjecture: As of October 2021, no such neutrinos are known to actually exist. "MicroBooNE has made a very comprehensive exploration through multiple types of interactions, and multiple analysis and reconstruction techniques", says co-spokesperson Bonnie Fleming of Yale. "They all tell us the same thing, and that gives us very high confidence in our results that we are not seeing a hint of a sterile neutrino." — CERN Courier... "eV-scale sterile neutrinos no longer appear to be experimentally motivated, and never solved any outstanding problems in the Standard Model", says theorist Mikhail Shaposhnikov of EPFL. "But GeV-to-keV-scale sterile neutrinos – so-called Majorana fermions – are well motivated theoretically and do not contradict any existing experiment." — CERN Courier,)

The quantum number weak charge (Q_{w}) serves the same role in the neutral current interaction with the Z^{0} that electric charge (Q, with no subscript) does in the electromagnetic interaction: It quantifies the vector part of the interaction. Its value is given by:
$$Q_\mathsf{w} = 2 \, T_3 - 4 \, Q \, \sin^2\theta_\mathsf{w} = 2 \, T_3 - Q + (1 - 4 \, \sin^2\theta_\mathsf{w}) \, Q ~.$$
Since the weak mixing angle $\theta_\mathsf{w} \approx 29^\circ$, the parenthetic expression $(1 - 4 \, \sin^2\theta_\mathsf{w}) \approx 0.060$, with its value varying slightly with the momentum difference (called "running") between the particles involved. Hence
$$\ Q_\mathsf{w} \approx 2 \ T_3 - Q = \sgn(Q)\ \big(1 - |Q|\big)\ ,$$
since by convention $\sgn T_3 \equiv \sgn Q$, and for all fermions involved in the weak interaction $T_3 = \pm\tfrac{1}{2}$. The weak charge of charged leptons is then close to zero, so these mostly interact with the Z boson through the axial coupling.

== Electroweak theory ==
The Standard Model of particle physics describes the electromagnetic interaction and the weak interaction as two different aspects of a single electroweak interaction. This theory was developed around 1968 by Sheldon Glashow, Abdus Salam, and Steven Weinberg, and they were awarded the 1979 Nobel Prize in Physics for their work. The Higgs mechanism provides an explanation for the presence of three massive gauge bosons (W^{+}, W^{−}, Z^{0}, the three carriers of the weak interaction), and the photon (γ, the massless gauge boson that carries the electromagnetic interaction).

According to the electroweak theory, at very high energies, the universe has four components of the Higgs field whose interactions are carried by four massless scalar bosons forming a complex scalar Higgs field doublet. Likewise, there are four massless electroweak vector bosons, each similar to the photon. However, at low energies, this gauge symmetry is spontaneously broken down to the U(1) symmetry of electromagnetism, since one of the Higgs fields acquires a vacuum expectation value. Naïvely, the symmetry-breaking would be expected to produce three massless bosons, but instead those "extra" three Higgs bosons become incorporated into the three weak bosons, which then acquire mass through the Higgs mechanism. These three composite bosons are the W^{+}, W^{−}, and Z^{0} bosons actually observed in the weak interaction. The fourth electroweak gauge boson is the photon (γ) of electromagnetism, which does not couple to any of the Higgs fields and so remains massless.

This theory has made a number of predictions, including a prediction of the masses of the Z and W bosons before their discovery and detection in 1983.

On 4 July 2012, the CMS and the ATLAS experimental teams at the Large Hadron Collider independently announced that they had confirmed the formal discovery of a previously unknown boson of mass between 125 and 127 GeV/c^{2}, whose behaviour so far was "consistent with" a Higgs boson, while adding a cautious note that further data and analysis were needed before positively identifying the new boson as being a Higgs boson of some type. By 14 March 2013, a Higgs boson was tentatively confirmed to exist.

In a speculative case where the electroweak symmetry breaking scale was lowered, the unbroken SU(2) interaction would eventually become confining. Alternative models where SU(2) becomes confining above that scale appear quantitatively similar to the Standard Model at lower energies, but dramatically different above symmetry breaking.

== Violation of symmetry ==
Left- and right-handed particles: p is the particle's momentum and S is its spin. Note the lack of reflective symmetry between the states.

The laws of nature were long thought to remain the same under mirror reflection. The results of an experiment viewed via a mirror were expected to be identical to the results of a separately constructed, mirror-reflected copy of the experimental apparatus watched through the mirror. This so-called law of parity conservation was known to be respected by classical gravitation, electromagnetism and the strong interaction; it was assumed to be a universal law. However, in the mid-1950s Chen-Ning Yang and Tsung-Dao Lee suggested that the weak interaction might violate this law. Chien Shiung Wu and collaborators in 1957 discovered that the weak interaction violates parity, earning Yang and Lee the 1957 Nobel Prize in Physics.

Although the weak interaction was once described by Fermi's theory, the discovery of parity violation and renormalization theory suggested that a new approach was needed. In 1957, Robert Marshak and George Sudarshan and, somewhat later, Richard Feynman and Murray Gell-Mann proposed a V − A (vector minus axial vector or left-handed) Lagrangian for weak interactions. In this theory, the weak interaction acts only on left-handed particles (and right-handed antiparticles). Since the mirror reflection of a left-handed particle is right-handed, this explains the maximal violation of parity. The V − A theory was developed before the discovery of the Z boson, so it did not include the right-handed fields that enter in the neutral current interaction.

However, this theory allowed a compound symmetry CP to be conserved. CP combines parity P (switching left to right) with charge conjugation C (switching particles with antiparticles). Physicists were again surprised when in 1964, James Cronin and Val Fitch provided clear evidence in kaon decays that CP symmetry could be broken too, winning them the 1980 Nobel Prize in Physics. In 1973, Makoto Kobayashi and Toshihide Maskawa showed that CP violation in the weak interaction required more than two generations of particles, effectively predicting the existence of a then unknown third generation. This discovery earned them half of the 2008 Nobel Prize in Physics.

Unlike parity violation, CP violation occurs only in rare circumstances. Despite its limited occurrence under present conditions, it is widely believed to be the reason that there is much more matter than antimatter in the universe, and thus forms one of Andrei Sakharov's three conditions for baryogenesis.

== History ==
In 1933, Enrico Fermi proposed the first theory of the weak interaction, known as Fermi's interaction. He suggested that beta decay could be explained by a four-fermion interaction, involving a contact force with no range.

In the mid-1950s, Chen-Ning Yang and Tsung-Dao Lee first suggested that the handedness of the spins of particles in weak interaction might violate the conservation law or symmetry. In 1957, the Wu experiment, carried out by Chien Shiung Wu and collaborators confirmed the symmetry violation.

In the 1960s, Sheldon Glashow, Abdus Salam and Steven Weinberg unified the electromagnetic force and the weak interaction by showing them to be two aspects of a single force, now termed the electroweak force.

The existence of the W and Z bosons was not directly confirmed until 1983.

== See also ==
- Weakless universe – the postulate that weak interactions are not anthropically necessary
- Gravity
- Strong interaction
- Electromagnetism

== Sources ==
=== Technical ===
- Greiner, W.; Müller, B. (2000). Gauge Theory of Weak Interactions. Springer. ISBN 3-540-67672-4.
- Coughlan, G. D.; Dodd, J. E.; Gripaios, B. M. (2006). The Ideas of Particle Physics: An introduction for scientists (3rd ed.). Cambridge University Press. ISBN 978-0-521-67775-2.
- Cottingham, W. N.; Greenwood, D. A. (2001) [1986]. An introduction to nuclear physics (2nd ed.). Cambridge University Press. p. 30. ISBN 978-0-521-65733-4.
- Griffiths, D. J. (1987). Introduction to Elementary Particles. John Wiley & Sons. ISBN 0-471-60386-4.
- Kane, G. L. (1987). Modern Elementary Particle Physics. Perseus Books. ISBN 0-201-11749-5.
- Perkins, D. H. (2000). Introduction to High Energy Physics. Cambridge University Press. ISBN 0-521-62196-8.

=== For general readers ===
- Oerter, R. (2006). The Theory of Almost Everything: The Standard Model, the unsung triumph of modern physics. Plume. ISBN 978-0-13-236678-6.
- Schumm, B. A. (2004). Deep Down Things: The breathtaking beauty of particle physics. Johns Hopkins University Press. ISBN 0-8018-7971-X.
