= Neutral current =

Weak force particle interaction

Weak neutral current interactions are one of the ways in which subatomic particles can interact by means of the weak force. These interactions are mediated by the Z boson. The discovery of weak neutral currents was a significant step toward the unification of electromagnetism and the weak force into the electroweak force, and led to the discovery of the W and Z bosons.

The other kind of weak interactions are the charged currents, mediated by the W bosons.

== In simple terms ==
The weak force is best known for its role in nuclear decay. It has very short range but (apart from gravity) is the only force to interact with neutrinos. Like other subatomic forces, the weak force is mediated via exchange particles, the W and Z bosons. The W particles are involved in beta decay, and have electric charge – there are both positive and negative W particles. The Z boson does not have any electrical charge.

Exchange of a Z boson transfers momentum, spin, and energy, but leaves the interacting particles' quantum numbers unaffected – charge, flavor, baryon number, lepton number, etc. Because there is no transfer of electrical charge involved, exchange of Z particles is referred to as "neutral" in the phrase "neutral current". However the word "current" here has nothing to do with electricity – it simply refers to the exchange of the Z particle.

The Z boson's neutral current interaction is determined by a derived quantum number called weak charge, which acts similarly to weak isospin for interactions with the W bosons.

== Definition ==
The neutral current that gives the interaction its name is that of the interacting particles.

For example, the neutral current contribution to the ν_{e}e^{−} → ν_{e}e^{−} elastic scattering amplitude is
$$\mathfrak{M}^\mathsf{NC} ~\propto~ J_\mu^{\mathsf{(NC)}}(\nu_\mathrm{e} ) \; J^{\mathsf{(NC)}\ \mu}(\mathrm{e^{-}})\ ,$$
where the neutral currents describing the flow of the neutrino and of the electron are given by:
$$J^{ \mathsf{(NC)}\ \mu }(f) = \bar{u}_{f}\ \gamma^\mu\ \frac{1}{2} \left( g^{f}_\mathsf{V} - g^{f}_\mathsf{A}\ \gamma^{5} \right)\ u_{f}\ ,$$
where:
$$g^{f}_\mathsf{V} = T_3(f) - 2\sin^2\theta_\mathsf{W}\ Q(f) = \frac{1}{2}\ Q_\mathsf{W}(f)$$
and $\ g^{f}_\mathsf{A} = T_3(f)\$ are the vector and axial couplings for fermion $\ f ~.$ $\ T_3\$ denotes the weak isospin of the fermions, Q their electric charge and $\ Q_\mathsf{W}\$ their weak charge. These couplings amount to essentially left chiral for neutrinos and axial for charged leptons.

The Z boson can couple to any Standard Model particle, except gluons and photons (sterile neutrinos would also be an exception, if they were found to exist). However, any interaction between two charged particles that can occur via the exchange of a virtual Z boson can also occur via the exchange of a virtual photon. Unless the interacting particles have energies on the order of the Z boson mass (91 GeV) or higher, the virtual Z boson exchange has an effect of a tiny correction, $\ (E/M_\mathrm{Z})^2\ ,$ to the amplitude of the electromagnetic process.

Particle accelerators with energies necessary to observe neutral current interactions and to measure the mass of Z boson weren't available until 1983.

On the other hand, Z boson interactions involving neutrinos have distinctive signatures: They provide the only known mechanism for elastic scattering of neutrinos in matter. Neutrinos are almost as likely to scatter elastically (via Z boson exchange) as inelastically (via W boson exchange); this effect has considerable significance for neutrino observational experiments, e.g. in the Sudbury Neutrino Observatory experiment.

Weak neutral currents were predicted by electroweak theory developed mainly by Abdus Salam, John Clive Ward, Sheldon Glashow and Steven Weinberg, and confirmed shortly thereafter in 1973, in a neutrino experiment in the Gargamelle bubble chamber at CERN.

== See also ==
- Flavor changing neutral current
- Neutral particle oscillation
- Electric current
- Quantum chromodynamics
- Sudbury Neutrino Observatory#Neutral current interaction
- Weak charge
