= Herschel Rabitz =

American chemistry professor

Herschel Albert Rabitz is a professor of chemistry at Princeton University who does both theoretical and experimental research. As of September 2022, he has an h-index of 99, an i-10 index of nearly 700, and nearly 50,000 citations. He completed his PhD in chemical physics at Harvard University in 1970. He completed post-doctorate work at the University of Wisconsin–Madison (1970–1971) and his bachelor's degree from University of California, Berkeley.

== Career ==
Rabitz joined Princeton in 1971 and was the chair of the chemistry department from 1993 until 1996. He is an affiliated member of their Program in Applied and Computational Mathematics.

His doctoral students have included Ramakrishna Ramaswamy.

=== Awards and honors ===
In 2003, he was awarded the Wallace E. Lamb Award for Laser Science and Quantum Optics.
