= Neutral particle =

Particle with no electric charge

In physics, a neutral particle is a particle without an electric charge, such as a neutron.

== Stable or long-lived neutral particles ==
Long-lived neutral particles provide a challenge in the construction of particle detectors, because they do not interact electromagnetically, except possibly through their magnetic moments. This means that they do not leave tracks of ionized particles or curve in magnetic fields. Examples of such particles include photons, (Note: Particle listings - gamma) neutrons, (Note: Particle listings – n) and neutrinos. (Note: Particle listings - Neutrino Properties)

== Other neutral particles ==
Other neutral particles are very short-lived and decay before they could be detected even if they were charged. They have been observed only indirectly. They include:

- Z bosons (Note: Particle listings - Z boson)
  - ZZ dibosons
- Higgs bosons (Note: Particle listings - Higgs boson)
- Dozens of heavy neutral hadrons:
  - Neutral mesons such as the π^{0} (Note: Particle listings - Pi0) and K^{0} (Note: Particle listings - K0)
  - The neutral Delta baryon (Δ^{0}), (Note: Particle listings – Δ(1232)) and other neutral baryons, such as the Ξ^{0} (Note: Particle listings - Xi0) and Λ^{0} (Note: Particle listings - Lambda)

In plasma science, atoms and molecules with no net electric charge are commonly referred to as neutral particles or neutrals.

== See also ==
- Neutral particle oscillation
- Truly neutral particle
