= Boson =

Class of subatomic particle

The class of Bosons is one of the two fundamental classes of subatomic particle, the other being fermions. All subatomic particles must be one or the other. A composite particle (hadron) may fall into either class depending on its composition.

In particle physics, a boson (/ˈboʊzɒn/ /ˈboʊsɒn/) is a subatomic particle whose spin quantum number has an integer value (0, 1, 2, ...). The class of bosons is one of the two fundamental classes of subatomic particle, the other being fermions, which have half odd-integer spin (1/2, 3/2, 5/2, ...). Every observed subatomic particle is either a boson or a fermion.

Some bosons are elementary particles occupying a special role in particle physics, distinct from the role of fermions (which are sometimes described as the constituents of "ordinary matter"). Certain elementary bosons (e.g. gluons) act as force carriers, which give rise to forces between other particles, while one (the Higgs boson) contributes to the phenomenon of mass. Other bosons, such as mesons, are composite particles made up of smaller constituents.

Outside the realm of particle physics, multiple identical composite bosons behave at high densities or low temperatures in a characteristic manner described by Bose–Einstein statistics: for example, a gas of helium-4 atoms becomes a superfluid at temperatures close to absolute zero. Similarly, superconductivity arises because some quasiparticles, such as Cooper pairs, behave in this characteristic manner.

== Name ==
The terms boson and fermion were coined by Paul Dirac to classify the fundamental particles that obey Bose–Einstein statistics, a quantum framework pioneered by the Indian physicist Satyendra Nath Bose. Bose achieved a fundamental breakthrough: by treating photons as identical and indistinguishable particles, he independently derived Planck's law without relying on classical physics. He sent this foundational manuscript to Albert Einstein, whose subsequent translation and endorsement of the work led to the formal development of the statistics and the theoretical prediction of the Bose–Einstein condensate.

== Elementary bosons ==
All observed elementary particles are either bosons (with integer spin) or fermions (with odd half-integer spin). Whereas the elementary particles that make up ordinary matter (leptons and quarks) are fermions, elementary bosons occupy a special role in particle physics. They act either as force carriers which give rise to forces between other particles, or in one case give rise to the phenomenon of mass.

According to the Standard Model of Particle Physics there are five elementary bosons:

- One scalar boson (spin = 0)
  - H^{0} Higgs boson – the particle that contributes to the phenomenon of mass via the Higgs mechanism
- Four vector bosons (spin = 1) that act as force carriers. These are the gauge bosons:
  - γ photon – the force carrier of the electromagnetic field
  - g gluons (eight different types) – force carriers that mediate the strong force
  - Z neutral weak boson – the force carrier that mediates the weak force
  - W^{±} charged weak bosons (two types) – also force carriers that mediate the weak force

A second-order tensor boson (spin = 2) called the graviton (G) has been hypothesised as the force carrier for gravity, but so far all attempts to incorporate gravity into the Standard Model have failed. (Note: Despite being the carrier of the gravitational force which interacts with mass, most attempts at quantum gravity have expected the graviton to have no mass, just like the photon has no electric charge, and the W and Z bosons have no "flavour".)

== Composite bosons ==
Composite particles (such as hadrons, nuclei, and atoms) can be bosons or fermions depending on their constituents. Since bosons have integer spin and fermions half odd-integer spin, any composite particle made up of an even number of fermions is a boson (e.g., 1/2 + 1/2 + 1/2 + 1/2 = 2 for the three quarks and an electron in a hydrogen atom).

Composite bosons include:

- All mesons of every type
- Stable nuclei with even mass numbers such as deuterium, helium-4 (the alpha particle), carbon-12, lead-208, and many others. (Note: Even-mass-number nuclides comprise 153 / 254 = 60% of all stable nuclides. They are bosons, i.e. they have integer spin, and almost all of them (148 of the 153) are even-proton / even-neutron (EE) nuclides. The EE nuclides necessarily have spin 0 because of pairing. The remaining 5 stable bosonic nuclides are odd-proton / odd-neutron (OO) stable nuclides (see Even and odd atomic nuclei § Odd proton, odd neutron). The five odd–odd bosonic nuclides are:^{2}_{1}H^{6}_{3}Li^{10}_{5}B^{14}_{7}N^{180m}_{73}Ta Each of the five has integer, nonzero spin.)

As quantum particles, the behaviour of multiple indistinguishable bosons at high densities is described by Bose–Einstein statistics. One characteristic which becomes important in superfluidity and other applications of Bose–Einstein condensates is that there is no restriction on the number of bosons that may occupy the same quantum state. As a consequence, when for example a gas of helium-4 atoms is cooled to temperatures very close to absolute zero and the kinetic energy of the particles becomes negligible, it condenses into a low-energy state and becomes a superfluid.

Other examples in condensed matter systems include Cooper pairs in superconductors and excitons in semiconductors.

== Quasiparticles ==
Certain quasiparticles are observed to behave as bosons and to follow Bose–Einstein statistics, including Cooper pairs, plasmons and phonons.

== See also ==
- Anyon – Type of two-dimensional quasiparticle
- Bose gas – State of matter of many bosons
- Parastatistics – Notion in statistical mechanics
