= Vector boson =

Boson with spin 1

In particle physics, a vector boson is a boson whose spin equals one. Vector bosons that are also elementary particles are gauge bosons, the force carriers of fundamental interactions. Some composite particles are vector bosons, for instance any vector meson (quark and antiquark). During the 1970s and 1980s, intermediate vector bosons (the W and Z bosons, which mediate the weak interaction) drew much attention in particle physics.

A pseudovector boson is a vector boson that has even parity, whereas "regular" vector bosons have odd parity. There are no fundamental pseudovector bosons, but there are pseudovector mesons.

== In relation to the Higgs boson ==
Feynman diagram of the fusion of two electroweak vector bosons to the scalar Higgs boson, which is a prominent process of the generation of Higgs bosons at particle accelerators (q: quark particle, W and Z: vector bosons of the electroweak interaction, H^{0}: Higgs boson)

The W and Z particles interact with the Higgs boson as shown in the Feynman diagram.

== Explanation ==
The name vector boson arises from quantum field theory. The component of such a particle's spin along any axis has the three eigenvalues −ħ, 0, and +ħ (where ħ is the reduced Planck constant), meaning that any measurement of its spin can only yield one of these values. (This is true for massive vector bosons; the situation differs for massless particles such as the photon, for reasons beyond the scope of this article. See Wigner's classification.)

The space of spin states therefore is a discrete degree of freedom consisting of three states, the same as the number of components of a vector in three-dimensional space. Quantum superpositions of these states can be taken such that they transform under rotations just like the spatial components of a rotating vector (the so-called 3 representation of SU(2)). If the vector boson is taken to be the quantum of a field, the field is a vector field, hence the name.

The boson part of the name arises from the spin-statistics relation, which requires that all integer spin particles be bosons.

== See also ==
- Scalar boson
- Maxwell's equations
- Proca action
