= Weinberg angle =

Angle characterizing electroweak symmetry breaking

Weinberg angle θ_{W}, and relation between couplings g, g′, and e = g sin θ_{W}. Adapted from Lee (1981).

The pattern of weak isospin, T_{3}, and weak hypercharge, Y_{W}, of the known elementary particles, showing electric charge, Q, (Note: The electric charge Q is distinct from the similar-appearing symbol occasionally used for momentum-transfer ∆Q. This article uses ∆q, but upper case is common and may occur in some graphs.) along the Weinberg angle. The neutral Higgs field (upper left, circled) breaks the electroweak symmetry and interacts with other particles to give them mass. Three components of the Higgs field become part of the massive W and Z bosons.

The weak mixing angle or Weinberg angle is a parameter in the Weinberg–Salam theory (by Steven Weinberg and Abdus Salam) of the electroweak interaction, part of the Standard Model of particle physics, and is usually denoted as θ_{W}. It is the angle by which spontaneous symmetry breaking rotates the original W^{0} and B^{0} vector boson plane, producing as a result the Z^{0} boson, and the photon. Its measured value is slightly below 30°, but also varies, very slightly increasing, depending on how high the relative momentum of the particles involved in the interaction is that the angle is used for.

== Details ==
The algebraic formula for the combination of the W^{0} and B^{0} vector bosons (i.e. 'mixing') that simultaneously produces the massive Z^{0} boson and the massless photon (γ) is expressed by the formula

$$\begin{pmatrix}
\gamma~ \\
\textsf{Z}^0 \end{pmatrix} = \begin{pmatrix}
\quad \cos \theta_\textsf{w} & \sin \theta_\textsf{w} \\
-\sin \theta_\textsf{w} & \cos \theta_\textsf{w} \end{pmatrix} \begin{pmatrix}
\textsf{B}^0 \\
\textsf{W}^0 \end{pmatrix} .$$

The weak mixing angle also gives the relationship between the masses of the W and Z bosons (denoted as m_{W} and m_{Z}),

$m_\textsf{Z} = \frac{m_\textsf{W}}{\,\cos\theta_\textsf{w}} \,.$

The angle can be expressed in terms of the SU(2)_{L} and U(1)_{Y} couplings (weak isospin g and weak hypercharge g′, respectively),

$\cos \theta_\textsf{w} = \frac{\quad g ~}{\ \sqrt{ g^2 + g'^{\ 2} ~}\ } \quad$ and $\quad \sin \theta_\textsf{w} = \frac{\quad g' ~}{\ \sqrt{ g^2 + g'^{\ 2} ~}\ } ~.$

The electric charge is then expressible in terms of it, e = g sin θ_{w} = g′ cos θ_{w} (refer to the figure).

Because the value of the mixing angle is currently determined empirically, in the absence of any superseding theoretical derivation it is mathematically defined as

$\cos \theta_\textsf{w} = \frac{\ m_\textsf{W}\ }{ m_\textsf{Z} } ~.$

The value of θ_{w} varies as a function of the momentum transfer, ∆q, at which it is measured. This variation, or 'running', is a key prediction of the electroweak theory. The most precise measurements have been carried out in electron–positron collider experiments at a value of ∆q = 91.2 GeV/c, corresponding to the mass of the Z^{0} boson, m_{Z}.

In practice, the quantity sin^{2} θ_{w} is more frequently used. The 2004 best estimate of sin^{2} θ_{w}, at ∆q = 91.2 GeV/c, in the M̅S̅ scheme is 0.23120±0.00015, which is an average over measurements made in different processes, at different detectors. Atomic parity violation experiments yield values for sin^{2} θ_{w} at smaller values of ∆q, below 0.01 GeV/c, but with much lower precision. In 2005 results were published from a study of parity violation in Møller scattering in which a value of sin^{2} θ_{w} = 0.2397±0.0013 was obtained at ∆q = 0.16 GeV/c, establishing experimentally the so-called 'running' of the weak mixing angle. These values correspond to a Weinberg angle varying between 28.7° and 29.3° ≈ 30°. LHCb measured in 7 and 8 TeV proton–proton collisions an effective angle of sin^{2} θ^{eff}_{w} = 0.23142, though the value of ∆q for this measurement is determined by the partonic collision energy, which is close to the Z boson mass.

CODATA 2022 gives the value

$\sin^2 \theta _\textsf{w} = 1 - \left( \frac{\ m_\textsf{W}\ }{ m_\textsf{Z} }\right)^2 = 0.22305(23) ~.$ (Note: Note that at present, there is no generally accepted theory that explains why the measured value θ_{w} ≈ 29° should be what it is. The specific value is not predicted by the Standard Model: The Weinberg angle θ_{w} is an open, free parameter, although it is constrained and predicted through other measurements of Standard Model quantities.)

The massless photon (γ) couples to the unbroken electric charge, Q = T_{3} + 1/ 2 Y_{w}, while the Z^{0} boson couples to the broken charge T_{3} − Q sin^{2} θ_{w}.
