= Truly neutral particle =

Particle that is its own antiparticle because all of its generalized charges are zero

In particle physics, a truly neutral particle is a subatomic particle that has no charge-like quantum numbers: They are their own antiparticle. In other words, it remains itself under the charge conjugation, which replaces particles with their corresponding antiparticles. All charges of a truly neutral particle must be equal to zero. This requires particles to not only be electrically neutral, but also requires that all of their other charges (such as the colour charge) be neutral.

== Examples ==
Known examples of such elementary particles include photons, Z bosons, and Higgs bosons, along with the hypothetical neutralinos, sterile neutrinos, and gravitons. For a spin-½ particle such as the neutralino, being truly neutral implies being a Majorana fermion.

By way of contrast, neutrinos are not truly neutral since they have a weak isospin of ± 1/2, or equivalently, a non-zero weak hypercharge, both of which are charge-like quantum numbers.
