= Ramakrishna Ramaswamy =

Indian academic

- Born: 14 October 1953 (age 73); Madras, Tamil Nadu, India
- Education: Loyola College, Chennai; University of Madras; IIT Kanpur; Princeton University
- Scientific career
- Fields: Nonlinear science, Computational biology
- Workplaces: University of Hyderabad, Jawaharlal Nehru University
- Doctoral advisor: Herschel Rabitz

Ram Ramaswamy (born 14 October 1953 in Chennai, India) is an Indian scientist and professor of chemistry at JNU.

== Education and career ==
He obtained his B.Sc. in chemistry (1972) from Loyola College, Chennai, then M.Sc. in chemistry from the IIT, Kanpur, and Ph.D. (1978) from Princeton University where he worked under the supervision of Herschel Rabitz. He then moved to California Institute of Technology, Pasadena, where was between 1978 and 1980, working with Prof. Rudolph A. Marcus.

He returned to India in 1980 and joined the Tata Institute of Fundamental Research as visiting fellow (1981) and fellow (1983). In 1986 he moved to the Jawaharlal Nehru University as one of the first members of the School of Physical Sciences, and has been at JNU since then. In addition to a professorship in the School of Physical Sciences, he is also on the faculty of the Centre for Computational Biology and Bioinformatics in the School for Computational and Integrative Sciences at JNU. He has to date supervised about 35 PhD students.

He spent a year on sabbatical at the Institute for Molecular Science in Okazaki, Japan (1989–90). A second sabbatical (2004–05) was spent at the Institute for Advanced Study, Princeton. In 2011 he was appointed Vice Chancellor of the University of Hyderabad. He resigned the position in January 2015, returning to his substantive positions at the Jawaharlal Nehru University. After his retirement from JNU in 2018, he joined IIT Delhi as visiting professor where is still serving.

He was Vice President of the Indian National Science Academy, New Delhi, as well as of the Indian Academy of Sciences, Bangalore. He served as President of the Indian Academy of Sciences, Bangalore.
