= W and Z bosons =

Bosons that mediate the weak interaction

W^{±} and Z^{0} Bosons
- Beta minus decay: a W boson mediates.
- Composition: Elementary particle
- Statistics: Bose–Einstein statistics
- Family: Gauge boson
- Interactions: W: Weak, electromagnetic Z: Weak
- Theorized: Glashow, Weinberg, Salam (1968)
- Discovered: UA1 and UA2 collaborations, CERN, 1983
- Mass: W: 80.3692±0.0133 GeV (2024); Z: 91.1880±0.0020 GeV
- Decay width: W: 2.085±0.042 GeV; Z: 2.4955±0.0023 GeV
- Electric charge: W: ±1 e Z: 0 e
- Spin: 1 ħ
- Weak isospin: W: ±1; Z: 0
- Weak hypercharge: 0

In particle physics, the W and Z bosons are vector bosons that are together known as the weak bosons or more generally as the intermediate vector bosons. These elementary particles mediate the weak interaction; the respective symbols are W^{+}, W^{−}, and Z^{0}. The W^{±} bosons have either a positive or negative electric charge of 1 elementary charge and are each other's antiparticles. The Z^{0} boson is electrically neutral and is its own antiparticle. The three particles each have a spin of 1. The W^{±} bosons have a magnetic moment, but the Z^{0} has none. All three of these particles are very short-lived, with a half-life of about 3×10^{−25} s. Their experimental discovery was pivotal in establishing what is now called the Standard Model of particle physics.

The W bosons are named after the weak force. The physicist Steven Weinberg named the additional particle the "Z particle", and later gave the explanation that it was the last additional particle needed by the model. The W bosons had already been named, and the Z bosons were named for having zero electric charge.

The two W bosons are verified mediators of neutrino absorption and emission. During these processes, the W^{±} boson charge induces electron or positron emission or absorption, thus causing nuclear transmutation.

The Z boson mediates the transfer of momentum, spin and energy when neutrinos scatter elastically from matter (a process which conserves charge). Such behavior is almost as common as inelastic neutrino interactions and may be observed in bubble chambers upon irradiation with neutrino beams. The Z boson is not involved in the absorption or emission of electrons or positrons. Whenever an electron is observed as a new free particle, suddenly moving with kinetic energy, it is inferred to be a result of a neutrino interacting with the electron (with the momentum transfer via the Z boson) since this behavior happens more often when the neutrino beam is present. In this process, the neutrino scatters off the electron (via exchange of a boson), transferring some of the neutrino's momentum to the electron. (Note: Because neutrinos are neither affected by the strong force nor the electromagnetic force, and because the gravitational force between subatomic particles is negligible, by deduction (technically, abduction), such an interaction can only happen via the weak force. Since such an electron is not created from a nucleon (the nucleus left behind remains the same as before) and the departing electron is unchanged, except for the impulse imparted by the neutrino, this force interaction between the neutrino and the electron must be mediated by an electromagnetically neutral, weak force boson. Thus, since no other neutrino-interacting neutral force carrier is known, the observed interaction must have occurred by exchange of a Z^{0} boson.)

== Basic properties ==
Physicists characterize particles by their energy equivalence at rest, using the mass energy equation to relate energy with mass. The W boson mass is 80.3692±0.0133 GeV and the Z boson is 91.1880±0.0020 GeV. These boson masses are larger than the energy equivalent mass of iron.

Their high masses limit the range of the weak interaction. By way of contrast, the photon is the force carrier of the electromagnetic force and has zero mass, consistent with the infinite range of electromagnetism; the hypothetical graviton is also expected to have zero mass. Although gluons are also presumed to have zero mass, the range of the strong nuclear force is limited for different reasons; see Color confinement.

All three bosons have particle spin s = 1 ħ. The emission of a W^{+} or W^{−} boson either lowers or raises the electric charge of the emitting particle by one unit, and also alters the spin by one unit. At the same time, the emission or absorption of a W^{±} boson can change the type of the particle – for example changing a strange quark into an up quark. The neutral Z boson cannot change the electric charge of any particle, nor can it change any other of the so-called "charges" (such as strangeness, baryon number, charm, etc.). The emission or absorption of a Z^{0} boson can only change the spin, momentum, and energy of the other particle. (See also Weak neutral current.)

== Relations to the weak nuclear force ==
The Feynman diagram for beta decay of a neutron into a proton, electron, and electron antineutrino via an intermediate W^{−} boson

The W and Z bosons are carrier particles that mediate the weak nuclear force, much as the photon is the carrier particle for the electromagnetic force.

=== W bosons ===
The W^{±} bosons are best known for their role in beta decay. Consider, for example, the beta decay of cobalt-60.

^{60}_{27}Co → ^{60}_{28}Ni^{+} + e^{−} + ν̅_{e}

This reaction does not involve the whole cobalt-60 nucleus, but affects only one of its 33 neutrons. The neutron is converted into a proton while also emitting an electron (often called a beta particle in this context) and an electron antineutrino:

n^{0} → p^{+} + e^{−} + ν̅_{e}

Again, the neutron is not an elementary particle but a composite of an up quark and two down quarks (udd). It is one of the down quarks that interacts in beta decay, turning into an up quark to form a proton (uud). At the most fundamental level, then, the weak force changes the flavour of a single quark:

d → u + W^{−}

which is immediately followed by decay of the W^{−} itself:

W^{−} → e^{−} + ν̅_{e}

=== Z bosons ===
The Z^{0} boson is its own antiparticle. Thus, all of its flavour quantum numbers and charges are zero. The exchange of a Z boson between particles, called a neutral current interaction, therefore leaves the interacting particles unaffected, except for a transfer of spin and/or momentum. (Note: However, see Flavor-changing neutral current for a conjecture that a rare Z exchange might cause flavor change.)

Z boson interactions involving neutrinos have distinct signatures: They provide the only known mechanism for elastic scattering of neutrinos in matter; neutrinos are almost as likely to scatter elastically (via Z boson exchange) as inelastically (via W boson exchange). (Note: The first prediction of Z bosons was made by Brazilian physicist José Leite Lopes in 1958, by devising an equation which showed the analogy of the weak nuclear interactions with electromagnetism. Steve Weinberg, Sheldon Glashow, and Abdus Salam later used these results to develop the electroweak unification, in 1973.) Weak neutral currents via Z boson exchange were confirmed shortly thereafter (also in 1973), in a neutrino experiment in the Gargamelle bubble chamber at CERN.

== Predictions of the W^{+}, W^{−} and Z^{0} bosons ==
A Feynman diagram showing the exchange of a pair of W bosons. This is one of the leading terms contributing to neutral Kaon oscillation.

Following the success of quantum electrodynamics in the 1950s, attempts were undertaken to formulate a similar theory of the weak nuclear force. This culminated around 1968 in a unified theory of electromagnetism and weak interactions by Sheldon Glashow, Steven Weinberg, and Abdus Salam, for which they shared the 1979 Nobel Prize in Physics. Their electroweak theory postulated not only the W bosons necessary to explain beta decay, but also a new Z boson that had never been observed.

The fact that the W and Z bosons have mass while photons are massless was a major obstacle in developing electroweak theory. These particles are accurately described by an SU(2) gauge theory, but the bosons in a gauge theory must be massless. As a case in point, the photon is massless because electromagnetism is described by a U(1) gauge theory. Some mechanism is required to break the SU(2) symmetry, giving mass to the W and Z in the process. The Higgs mechanism, first put forward by the 1964 PRL symmetry breaking papers, fulfills this role. It requires the existence of another particle, the Higgs boson, which has since been found at the Large Hadron Collider. Of the four components of a Goldstone boson created by the Higgs field, three are absorbed by the W^{+}, Z^{0}, and W^{−} bosons to form their longitudinal components, and the remainder appears as the spin-0 Higgs boson.

The combination of the SU(2) gauge theory of the weak interaction, the electromagnetic interaction, and the Higgs mechanism is known as the Glashow–Weinberg–Salam model. Today it is widely accepted as one of the pillars of the Standard Model of particle physics, particularly given the 2012 discovery of the Higgs boson by the CMS and ATLAS experiments.

The model predicts that W^{±} and Z^{0} bosons have the following masses:
$$\begin{align}
m_{\text{W}^\pm} &= \tfrac{1}{2}vg \\
m_{\text{Z}^0} &= \tfrac{1}{2} v\sqrt{g^2+{g'}^2}
\end{align}$$
where $g$ is the SU(2) gauge coupling, $g'$ is the U(1) gauge coupling, and $v$ is the Higgs vacuum expectation value.

== Discovery ==
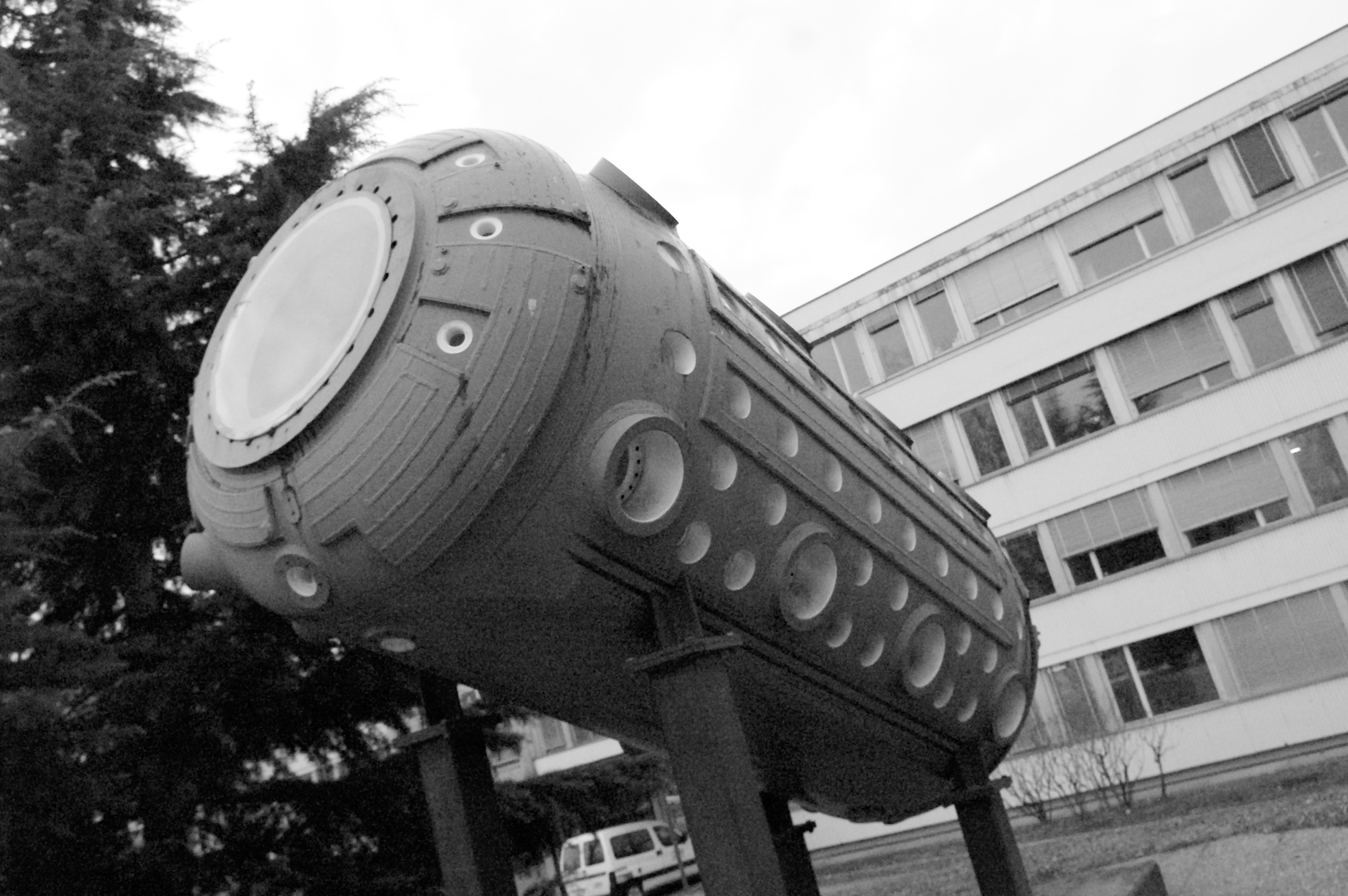
The Gargamelle bubble chamber, now exhibited at CERN

Unlike beta decay, the observation of neutral current interactions that involve particles other than neutrinos requires huge investments in particle accelerators and particle detectors, such as are available in only a few high-energy physics laboratories in the world (and then only after 1983). This is because Z bosons behave in somewhat the same manner as photons, but do not become important until the energy of the interaction is comparable with the relatively huge mass of the Z boson.

The discovery of the W and Z bosons was considered a major success for CERN. First, in 1973, came the observation of neutral current interactions as predicted by electroweak theory. The huge Gargamelle bubble chamber photographed the tracks produced by neutrino interactions and observed events where a neutrino interacted but did not produce a corresponding lepton. This is a hallmark of a neutral current interaction and is interpreted as a neutrino exchanging an unseen Z boson with a proton or neutron in the bubble chamber. The neutrino is otherwise undetectable, so the only observable effect is the momentum imparted to the proton or neutron by the interaction.

The discovery of the W and Z bosons themselves had to wait for the construction of a particle accelerator powerful enough to produce them. The first such machine that became available was the Super Proton Synchrotron, where unambiguous signals of W bosons were seen in January 1983 during a series of experiments made possible by Carlo Rubbia and Simon van der Meer. The actual experiments were called UA1 (led by Rubbia) and UA2 (led by Pierre Darriulat), and were the collaborative effort of many people. Van der Meer was the driving force on the accelerator end (stochastic cooling). UA1 and UA2 found the Z boson a few months later, in May 1983. Rubbia and van der Meer were promptly awarded the 1984 Nobel Prize in Physics, a most unusual step for the conservative Nobel Foundation.

The W^{+}, W^{−}, and Z^{0} bosons, together with the photon (γ), comprise the four gauge bosons of the electroweak interaction.

== Measurements of W boson mass ==
In May 2024, the Particle Data Group estimated the World Average mass for the W boson to be 80369.2 ± 13.3 MeV, based on experiments to date.

As of 2021, experimental measurements of the W boson mass had been similarly assessed to converge around 80379±12 MeV, all consistent with one another and with the Standard Model.

In April 2022, a new analysis of historical data from the Fermilab Tevatron collider before its closure in 2011 determined the mass of the W boson to be 80433±9 MeV, which was seven standard deviations above that predicted by the Standard Model. Besides being inconsistent with the Standard Model, the new measurement was also inconsistent with previous measurements such as ATLAS. This suggests that either the old or the new measurements had an unexpected systematic error, such as an undetected quirk in the equipment. This led to careful reevaluation of this data analysis and other historical measurements, as well as the planning of future measurements to confirm the potential new result. Fermilab Deputy Director Joseph Lykken reiterated that "... the (new) measurement needs to be confirmed by another experiment before it can be interpreted fully."

In 2023, an improved ATLAS experiment measured the W boson mass at 80360±16 MeV, aligning with predictions from the Standard Model.

The Particle Data Group convened a working group on the Tevatron measurement of W boson mass, including W-mass experts from all hadron collider experiments to date, to understand the discrepancy. In May 2024 they concluded that the Collider Detector at Fermilab (CDF) measurement was an outlier, and the best estimate of the mass came from leaving out that measurement from the meta-analysis. "The corresponding value of the W boson mass is m_{W} = 80369.2±13.3 MeV, which we quote as the World Average."

In September 2024, the CMS experiment measured the W boson mass at 80360.2±9.9 MeV. This was the most precise measurement to date, obtained from observations of a large number of W → μν decays.

== Decay ==
The W and Z bosons decay to fermion pairs but neither the W nor the Z bosons have sufficient energy to decay into the highest-mass top quark. Neglecting phase space effects and higher order corrections, simple estimates of their branching fractions can be calculated from the coupling constants.

=== W bosons ===
W bosons can decay to a lepton and antilepton (one of them charged and another neutral) (Note: Specifically: W^{−} → charged lepton + antineutrino W^{+} → charged antilepton + neutrino) or to a quark and antiquark of complementary types (with opposite electric charges ± 1/3 e and ∓ 2/3 e). The decay width of the W boson to a quark–antiquark pair is proportional to the corresponding squared CKM matrix element and the number of quark colours, N_{C} = 3. The decay widths for the W^{+} boson are then proportional to:

| Leptons | | Quarks | | | | | |
|---|---|---|---|---|---|---|---|
| e^{+}ν_{e} | 1 | ud̅ | 3 $|V_\text{ud}|^2$ | us̅ | 3 $|V_\text{us}|^2$ | ub̅ | 3 $|V_\text{ub}|^2$ |
| μ^{+}ν_{μ} | 1 | cd̅ | 3 $|V_\text{cd}|^2$ | cs̅ | 3 $|V_\text{cs}|^2$ | cb̅ | 3 $|V_\text{cb}|^2$ |
| τ^{+}ν_{τ} | 1 | Energy conservation forbids decay to t. | | | | | |

Here, e^{+}, μ^{+}, τ^{+} denote the three flavours of leptons (more exactly, the positive charged antileptons). ν_{e}, ν_{μ}, ν_{τ} denote the three flavours of neutrinos. The other particles, starting with u and d̅, all denote quarks and antiquarks (factor N_{C} is applied). The various $V_{ij}$ denote the corresponding CKM matrix coefficients. (Note: Every entry in the lepton column can also be written as three decays, e.g. for the first row, as e^{+}ν_{1}, e^{+}ν_{2}, e^{+}ν_{3}, for every neutrino mass eigenstate, with decay widths proportional to $\vert U_\text{e1} \vert^2$, $\vert U_\text{e2} \vert^2$, $\vert U_\text{e3} \vert^2$ (PMNS matrix elements), but experiments at present that measure the decays can't discriminate between neutrino mass eigenstates: They measure total decay width of the sum of all three processes.)

Unitarity of the CKM matrix implies that $~ |V_\text{ud}|^2 + |V_\text{us}|^2 + |V_\text{ub}|^2 ~ =$ $~|V_\text{cd}|^2 + |V_\text{cs}|^2 + |V_\text{cb}|^2 = 1 ~,$ thus each of two quark rows sums to 3. Therefore, the leptonic branching ratios of the W boson are approximately $\, B( \mathrm{e}^{+} \mathrm{\nu}_\mathrm{e}) = \,$$\, B(\mathrm{\mu}^{+} \mathrm{\nu}_\mathrm{\mu}) = \,$$\, B(\mathrm{\tau}^{+} \mathrm{\nu}_\mathrm{\tau}) = \,$ 1/9. The hadronic branching ratio is dominated by the CKM-favored ud̅ and cs̅ final states. The sum of the hadronic branching ratios has been measured experimentally to be 67.60±0.27%, with $\, B( \ell^{+} \mathrm{\nu}_\ell ) = \,$ 10.80±0.09%.

=== Z^{0} boson ===
Z bosons decay into a fermion and its antiparticle. As the Z^{0} boson is a mixture of the pre-symmetry-breaking W^{0} and B^{0} bosons (see weak mixing angle), each vertex factor includes a factor $T_3 - Q \sin^2 \,\theta_\text{W}$, where $T_3$ is the third component of the weak isospin of the fermion (the "charge" for the weak force), $Q$ is the electric charge of the fermion (in units of the elementary charge), and $\theta_\text{w}$ is the weak mixing angle. Because the weak isospin $( T_3 )$ is different for fermions of different chirality, either left-handed or right-handed, the coupling is different as well.

The relative strengths of each coupling can be estimated by considering that the decay rates include the square of these factors, and all possible diagrams (e.g. sum over quark families, and left and right contributions). The results tabulated below are just estimates, since they only include tree-level interaction diagrams in the Fermi theory.

| Particles | | $\, T_3 - Q \sin^2 \,\theta_\text{W}\,$ | | Relative factor | Branching ratio | |
| Name | Symbols | left | right | Relative factor | Predicted for x = 0.23 | Experimental measurements |
|---|---|---|---|---|---|---|
| Neutrinos (all) | ν_{e}, ν_{μ}, ν_{τ} | 1/ 2 | 0 (Note: In the Standard Model, right-handed neutrinos (and left-handed anti-neutrinos) do not exist; however, some extensions beyond the Standard Model allow them. If they do exist, they all have isospin T_{3} = 0 and electric charge Q = 0, and with color charge also zero. The all-zero charges make them "sterile", i.e. unable to interact by either the weak or electric forces, and no strong-force interactions either.) | 3 (1/ 2 )^{2} | 20.5% | 20.00±0.06% |
| Charged leptons (all) | e^{−}, μ^{−}, τ^{−} | | | 3 (−1/ 2 + x)^{2} + 3 x^{2} | 10.2% | 10.097±0.003% |
| Electron | e^{−} | −1/ 2 + x | x | (−1/ 2 + x)^{2} + x^{2} | 3.4% | 3.363±0.004% |
| Muon | μ^{−} | −1/ 2 + x | x | (−1/ 2 + x)^{2} + x^{2} | 3.4% | 3.366±0.007% |
| Tau | τ^{−} | −1/ 2 + x | x | (−1/ 2 + x)^{2} + x ^{2} | 3.4% | 3.367±0.008% |
| Hadrons | | | | | 69.2% | 69.91±0.06% |
| Down-type quarks | d, s, b | −1/ 2 + 1/ 3 x | 1/3x | 3 (−1/ 2 + 1/ 3 x)^{2} + 3 (1/ 3 x)^{2} | 15.2% | 15.6±0.4% |
| Up-type quarks (* except t) | u, c | 1/ 2 − 2/ 3 x | −2/ 3 x | 3 ( 1/ 2 − 2/ 3 x)^{2} + 3 (−2/ 3 x)^{2} | 11.8% | 11.6±0.6% |

To keep the notation compact, the table uses $x = \sin^2\ \theta_\text{w} \approx \tfrac{1}{4}$.

* The impossible decay into a top quark–antiquark pair is left out of the table. (Note: The mass of the t quark plus a t̅ is greater than the mass of the Z boson, so it does not have sufficient energy to decay into a tt̅ quark pair.)

Subheadings left and right denote the chirality or "handedness" of the fermions.

In 2018, the CMS collaboration observed the first exclusive decay of the Z boson to a ψ meson and a lepton–antilepton pair.

== See also ==
- Bose–Einstein statistics – Description of the behaviour of bosons
- Higgs boson – Elementary particle involved with rest mass
- List of particles
- Mathematical formulation of the Standard Model – Mathematics of a particle physics model
- Weak charge
- W′ and Z′ bosons – Hypothetical particles in physics
- X and Y bosons – Hypothetical elementary particles: analogous pair of bosons predicted by the Grand Unified Theory
- ZZ diboson
