= Symmetry breaking =

Physical process transitioning a system from a symmetric state to a more ordered state

A ball is initially located at the top of the central hill (C). This position is an unstable equilibrium: a very small perturbation will cause it to fall to one of the two stable wells left (L) or right (R). Even if the hill is symmetric and there is no reason for the ball to fall on either side, the observed final state is not symmetric.

In physics, symmetry breaking is a phenomenon where a disordered but symmetric state collapses into an ordered, but less symmetric state. This collapse is often one of many possible bifurcations that a particle can take as it approaches a lower energy state. Due to the many possibilities, an observer may assume the result of the collapse to be arbitrary. This phenomenon is fundamental to quantum field theory (QFT), and further, contemporary understandings of physics. Specifically, it plays a central role in the Glashow–Weinberg–Salam model which forms part of the Standard Model modelling the electroweak sector.

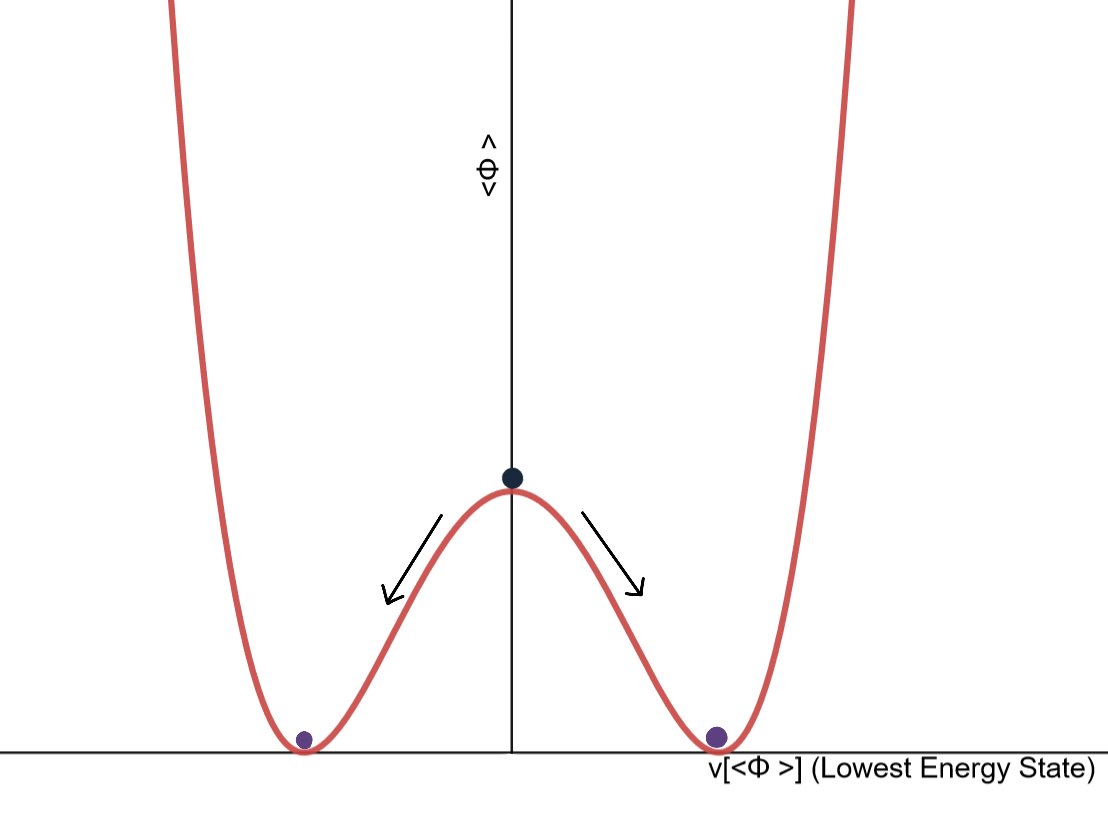
A (black) particle is always driven to lowest energy. In the proposed $\mathbb{Z}_2$-Symmetric system, it has two possible (purple) states. When it spontaneously breaks symmetry, it collapses into one of the two states. This phenomenon is known as spontaneous symmetry breaking.

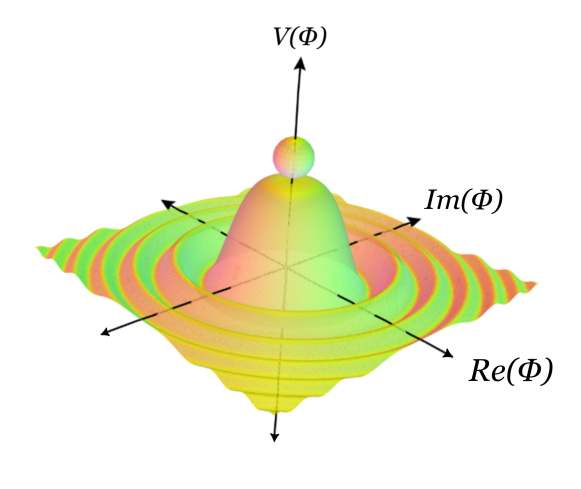
A 3D representation of a particle in a symmetric system (a Higgs Mechanism) before assuming a lower energy state

In an infinite system (Minkowski spacetime) symmetry breaking occurs, however in a finite system (that is, any real super-condensed system), the system is less predictable, but in many cases quantum tunneling occurs. Symmetry breaking and tunneling relate through the collapse of a particle into non-symmetric state as it seeks a lower energy.

Symmetry breaking can be distinguished into two types, explicit and spontaneous. They are characterized by whether the equations of motion fail to be invariant, or the ground state fails to be invariant.

== Non-technical description ==
This section describes spontaneous symmetry breaking. This is the idea that for a physical system, the lowest energy configuration (the vacuum state) is not the most symmetric configuration of the system. Roughly speaking, there are three types of symmetry that can be broken: discrete, continuous and gauge, ordered in increasing technicality.

An example of a system with discrete symmetry is given by the figure with the red graph: consider a particle moving on this graph, subject to gravity. A similar graph could be given by the function $f(x) = (x^2 - a^2)^2$. This system is symmetric under reflection in the y-axis. There are three possible stationary states for the particle: the top of the hill at $x = 0$, or the bottom, at $x = \pm a$. When the particle is at the top, the configuration respects the reflection symmetry: the particle stays in the same place when reflected. However, the lowest energy configurations are those at $x = \pm a$. When the particle is in either of these configurations, it is no longer fixed under reflection in the y-axis: reflection swaps the two vacuum states.

An example with continuous symmetry is given by a 3d analogue of the previous example, from rotating the graph around an axis through the top of the hill, or equivalently given by the graph $f(x,y) = (x^2 + y^2 - a^2)^2$. This is essentially the graph of the Mexican hat potential. This has a continuous symmetry given by rotation about the axis through the top of the hill (as well as a discrete symmetry by reflection through any radial plane). Again, if the particle is at the top of the hill it is fixed under rotations, but it has higher gravitational energy at the top. At the bottom, it is no longer invariant under rotations but minimizes its gravitational potential energy. Furthermore rotations move the particle from one energy minimizing configuration to another. There is a novelty here not seen in the previous example: from any of the vacuum states it is possible to access any other vacuum state with only a small amount of energy, by moving around the trough at the bottom of the hill, whereas in the previous example, to access the other vacuum, the particle would have to cross the hill, requiring a large amount of energy.

Gauge symmetry breaking is the most subtle, but has important physical consequences. Roughly speaking, for the purposes of this section a gauge symmetry is an assignment of systems with continuous symmetry to every point in spacetime. Gauge symmetry forbids mass generation for gauge fields, yet massive gauge fields (W and Z bosons) have been observed. Spontaneous symmetry breaking was developed to resolve this inconsistency. The idea is that in an early stage of the universe it was in a high energy state, analogous to the particle being at the top of the hill, and so had full gauge symmetry and all the gauge fields were massless. As it cooled, it settled into a choice of vacuum, thus spontaneously breaking the symmetry, thus removing the gauge symmetry and allowing mass generation of those gauge fields. A full explanation is highly technical: see electroweak interaction.

== Spontaneous symmetry breaking ==
In spontaneous symmetry breaking (SSB), the equations of motion of the system are invariant, but any vacuum state (lowest energy state) is not.

For an example with two-fold symmetry, if there is some atom that has two vacuum states, occupying either one of these states breaks the two-fold symmetry. This act of selecting one of the states as the system reaches a lower energy is SSB. When this happens, the atom is no longer $\mathbb{Z}_2$ symmetric (reflectively symmetric) and has collapsed into a lower energy state.

Such a symmetry breaking is parametrized by an order parameter. A special case of this type of symmetry breaking is dynamical symmetry breaking.

In the Lagrangian setting of quantum field theory (QFT), the Lagrangian $L$ is a functional of quantum fields which is invariant under the action of a symmetry group $G$. However, the vacuum expectation value formed when the particle collapses to a lower energy may not be invariant under $G$. In this instance, it will partially break the symmetry of $G$, into a subgroup $H$. This is spontaneous symmetry breaking.

Within the context of gauge symmetry however, SSB is the phenomenon by which gauge fields "acquire mass" despite gauge-invariance enforcing that such fields be massless. This is because the SSB of gauge symmetry breaks gauge-invariance, and such a break allows for the existence of massive gauge fields. This is an important exemption from Goldstone's theorem, where a Nambu-Goldstone boson can gain mass, becoming a Higgs boson in the process.

Further, in this context the usage of "symmetry breaking" while standard, is a misnomer, as gauge "symmetry" is not really a symmetry but a redundancy in the description of the system. Mathematically, this redundancy is a choice of trivialization, somewhat analogous to redundancy arising from a choice of basis.

Spontaneous symmetry breaking is also associated with phase transitions. For example in the Ising model, as the temperature of the system falls below the critical temperature the $\mathbb{Z}_2$ symmetry of the vacuum is broken, giving a phase transition of the system.

== Explicit symmetry breaking ==
Relativistic fine structure corrections (Dirac) to the Bohr model of the hydrogen atom break the symmetries and split the degenerate levels. The Lyman-alpha line (emitted in a transition from n = 2 to n = 1) splits into a doublet.

In explicit symmetry breaking (ESB), the equations of motion describing a system are variant under the broken symmetry. In Hamiltonian mechanics or Lagrangian mechanics, this happens when there is at least one term in the Hamiltonian (or Lagrangian) that explicitly breaks the given symmetry.

In the Hamiltonian setting, this is often studied when the Hamiltonian can be written $H = H_0 + H_{\text{int}}$.

Here $H_0$ is a 'base Hamiltonian', which has some manifest symmetry. More explicitly, it is symmetric under the action of a (Lie) group $G$. Often this is an integrable Hamiltonian.

The $H_{\text{int}}$ is a perturbation or interaction Hamiltonian. This is not invariant under the action of $G$. It is often proportional to a small, perturbative parameter.

This is essentially the paradigm for perturbation theory in quantum mechanics. An example of its use is in finding the fine structure of atomic spectra.

== Examples ==
Symmetry breaking can cover any of the following scenarios:

- The breaking of an exact symmetry of the underlying laws of physics by the apparently random formation of some structure;
- A situation in physics in which a minimal energy state has less symmetry than the system itself;
- Situations where the actual state of the system does not reflect the underlying symmetries of the dynamics because the manifestly symmetric state is unstable (stability is gained at the cost of local asymmetry);
- Situations where the equations of a theory may have certain symmetries, though their solutions may not (the symmetries are "hidden").

One of the first cases of broken symmetry discussed in the physics literature is related to the form taken by a uniformly rotating body of incompressible fluid in gravitational and hydrostatic equilibrium. Jacobi and soon later Liouville, in 1834, discussed the fact that a tri-axial ellipsoid was an equilibrium solution for this problem when the kinetic energy compared to the gravitational energy of the rotating body exceeded a certain critical value. The axial symmetry presented by the McLaurin spheroids is broken at this bifurcation point. Furthermore, above this bifurcation point, and for constant angular momentum, the solutions that minimize the kinetic energy are the non-axially symmetric Jacobi ellipsoids instead of the Maclaurin spheroids.

== See also ==
- Higgs mechanism
- QCD vacuum
- 1964 PRL symmetry breaking papers
