= List of things named after Richard Dedekind =

This is a list of things named after Richard Dedekind. Richard Dedekind (1831–1916), a mathematician, is the eponym of all of the things (and topics) listed below.

- 19293 Dedekind
- Cantor–Dedekind axiom
- Dedekind completeness
- Dedekind cut
- Dedekind discriminant theorem
- Dedekind domain
- Dedekind eta function
- Dedekind function
- Dedekind group
- Dedekind number
  - Dedekind's problem
- Dedekind–Peano axioms
- Dedekind psi function
- Dedekind ring
- Dedekind sum
- Dedekind valuation
- Dedekind zeta function
- Dedekind–Hasse norm
- Dedekind-infinite set
- Dedekind–MacNeille completion
- Dedekind's axiom
- Dedekind's complementary module
- Dedekind lattice
- Jordan–Dedekind lattice
- Dedekind's theorem on ellipsoids of equilibrium
