= Mean radius (astronomy) =

Measure for the size of planets and other Solar System objects

A sphere (top), rotational ellipsoid (left) and tri-axial ellipsoid (right)

The mean radius or volumetric radius in astronomy is a measure for the size of planets and small Solar System bodies. Alternatively, the closely related mean diameter ($D$), which is twice the mean radius, is also used. For a non-spherical object, the mean radius (denoted $R$ or $r$) is defined as the radius of the sphere that would enclose the same volume as the object. In the case of a sphere, the mean radius is equal to the radius.

For any irregularly shaped rigid body, there is a unique ellipsoid with the same volume and moments of inertia. In astronomy, the dimensions of an object are defined as the principal axes of that special ellipsoid.

== Calculation ==
The dimensions of a minor planet can be uni-, bi- or tri-axial, depending on what kind of ellipsoid is used to model it. Given the dimensions of an irregularly shaped object, one can calculate its mean radius:

An oblate spheroid, bi-axial, or rotational ellipsoid with axes $a$ and $c$ has a mean radius of $R=(a^{2} \cdot c )^{1/3}$.

A tri-axial ellipsoid with axes $a$, $b$ and $c$ has mean radius $R=(a \cdot b \cdot c)^{1/3}$. The formula for a rotational ellipsoid is the special case where $a=b$.

For a sphere, which is uni-axial ($a=b=c$), this simplifies to $R=a$.

Planets and dwarf planets are nearly spherical if they are not rotating. A rotating object that is massive enough to be in hydrostatic equilibrium will be close in shape to an ellipsoid, with the details depending on the rate of the rotation. At moderate rates, it will assume the form of either a bi-axial (Maclaurin) or tri-axial (Jacobi) ellipsoid. At faster rotations, non-ellipsoidal shapes can be expected, but these are not stable.

== Examples ==
- For planet Earth, which can be approximated as an oblate spheroid with radii 6378.1 km and 6356.8 km, the mean radius is $R=\left((6378.1~\text{km})^{2}\cdot6356.8~\text{km}\right)^{1/3}=6371.0~\text{km}$. The equatorial and polar radii of a planet are often denoted $r_{e}$ and $r_{p}$, respectively.
- The asteroid 511 Davida, which is close in shape to a tri-axial ellipsoid with dimensions 360 km × 294 km × 254 km, has a mean diameter of $D=(360~\text{km}\cdot294~\text{km}\cdot254~\text{km})^{1/3}=300\text{ km}$.
- Assuming it is in hydrostatic equilibrium, the dwarf planet Haumea has dimensions 2,100 × 1,680 × 1,074 km, resulting in a mean diameter of $D=\left(2100~\text{km}\cdot1680~\text{km}\cdot1074~\text{km}\right)^{1/3}=1559~\text{km}$. The rotational physics of deformable bodies predicts that over as little as a hundred days, a body rotating as rapidly as Haumea will have been distorted into the equilibrium form of a tri-axial ellipsoid.

== See also ==
- Earth ellipsoid
- Geoid
- Geometric mean
- Planetary radius
