= Dedekind function =

In number theory, Dedekind function can refer to any of three functions, all introduced by Richard Dedekind

- Dedekind eta function
- Dedekind psi function
- Dedekind zeta function
