= Goldstone boson =

Type of massless subatomic particle

In physics, Goldstone bosons or Nambu–Goldstone bosons (NGBs) are bosons that appear necessarily in models exhibiting spontaneous breakdown of continuous symmetries. They were discovered by Yoichiro Nambu within the context of the BCS superconductivity mechanism, and subsequently elucidated by Jeffrey Goldstone, and systematically generalized in the context of quantum field theory. In condensed matter physics such bosons are quasiparticles and are known as Goldstone modes or Anderson–Bogoliubov modes.

These spinless bosons correspond to the spontaneously broken internal symmetry generators, and are characterized by the quantum numbers of these. They transform nonlinearly (shift) under the action of these generators, and can thus be excited out of the asymmetric vacuum by these generators. Thus, they can be thought of as the excitations of the field in the broken symmetry directions in group space—and are massless if the spontaneously broken symmetry is not also broken explicitly.

If, instead, the symmetry is not exact, i.e. if it is explicitly broken as well as spontaneously broken, then the bosons that emerge are not massless, though they typically remain relatively light; they are called pseudo-Goldstone bosons or pseudo–Nambu–Goldstone bosons.

== Goldstone's theorem ==
Goldstone's theorem examines a generic continuous symmetry which is spontaneously broken; i.e., its currents are conserved, but the ground state is not invariant under the action of the corresponding charges. Then, necessarily, new massless (or light, if the symmetry is not exact) scalar particles appear in the spectrum of possible excitations. There is one scalar particle—called a Nambu–Goldstone boson—for each generator of the symmetry that is broken, i.e., that does not preserve the ground state. The Nambu–Goldstone mode is a long-wavelength fluctuation of the corresponding order parameter.

By virtue of their special properties in coupling to the vacuum of the respective symmetry-broken theory, vanishing momentum ("soft") Goldstone bosons involved in field-theoretic amplitudes make such amplitudes vanish ("Adler zeros").

== Examples ==
=== Natural ===
- In fluids, the phonon is longitudinal and it is the Goldstone boson of the spontaneously broken Galilean symmetry. In solids, the situation is more complicated; the Goldstone bosons are the longitudinal and transverse phonons and they happen to be the Goldstone bosons of spontaneously broken Galilean, translational, and rotational symmetry with no simple one-to-one correspondence between the Goldstone modes and the broken symmetries.
- In magnets, the original rotational symmetry (present in the absence of an external magnetic field) is spontaneously broken such that the magnetization points in a specific direction. The Goldstone bosons then are the magnons, i.e., spin waves in which the local magnetization direction oscillates.
- The pions are the pseudo-Goldstone bosons that result from the spontaneous breakdown of the chiral-flavor symmetries of QCD effected by quark condensation due to the strong interaction. These symmetries are further explicitly broken by the masses of the quarks so that the pions are not massless, but their mass is significantly smaller than typical hadron masses.
- The longitudinal polarization components of the W and Z bosons correspond to the Goldstone bosons of the spontaneously broken part of the electroweak symmetry SU(2)⊗U(1), which, however, are not observable. (Note: In theories with gauge symmetry, the Goldstone bosons are absent. Their degrees of freedom are absorbed ("eaten", gauged out) by gauge bosons, through the Higgs mechanism. The latter become massive and their new, longitudinal polarization is provided by the would-be Goldstone boson, in an elaborate rearrangement of degrees of freedom .) Because this symmetry is gauged, the three would-be Goldstone bosons are absorbed by the three gauge bosons corresponding to the three broken generators; this gives these three gauge bosons a mass and the associated necessary third polarization degree of freedom. This is described in the Standard Model through the Higgs mechanism. An analogous phenomenon occurs in superconductivity, which served as the original source of inspiration for Nambu, namely, the photon develops a dynamical mass (expressed as magnetic flux exclusion from a superconductor), cf. the Ginzburg–Landau theory.
- Primordial fluctuations during inflation can be viewed as Goldstone bosons arising due to the spontaneous symmetry breaking of time translation symmetry of a de Sitter universe. These fluctuations in the inflaton scalar field subsequently seed cosmic structure formation.
- Ricciardi and Umezawa proposed in 1967 a general theory (quantum brain) about the possible brain mechanism of memory storage and retrieval in terms of Nambu–Goldstone bosons. This theory was subsequently extended in 1995 by Giuseppe Vitiello taking into account that the brain is an "open" system (the dissipative quantum model of the brain). Applications of spontaneous symmetry breaking and of Goldstone's theorem to biological systems, in general, have been published by E. Del Giudice, S. Doglia, M. Milani, and G. Vitiello, and by E. Del Giudice, G. Preparata and G. Vitiello. Mari Jibu and Kunio Yasue and Giuseppe Vitiello, based on these findings, discussed the implications for consciousness.

=== Theory ===
Consider a complex scalar field ϕ, with the constraint that $\phi^* \phi= v^2$, a constant. One way to impose a constraint of this sort is by including a potential interaction term in its Lagrangian density,

$$\lambda(\phi^*\phi - v^2)^2  ~,$$

and taking the limit as λ → ∞. This is called the "Abelian nonlinear σ-model". (Note: It corresponds to the Goldstone sombrero potential where the tip and the sides shoot to infinity, preserving the location of the minimum at its base.)

The constraint, and the action, below, are invariant under a U(1) phase transformation, δϕ=iεϕ. The field can be redefined to give a real scalar field (i.e., a spin-zero particle) θ without any constraint by

$$\phi = v e^{i\theta}$$

where θ is the Nambu–Goldstone boson (actually $v\theta$ is) and the U(1) symmetry transformation effects a shift on θ, namely

$$\delta \theta = \epsilon ~,$$

but does not preserve the ground state |0〉 (i.e. the above infinitesimal transformation does not annihilate it—the hallmark of invariance), as evident in the charge of the current below.

Thus, the vacuum is degenerate and noninvariant under the action of the spontaneously broken symmetry.

The corresponding Lagrangian density is given by

$${\mathcal L}=\frac{1}{2}(\partial^\mu \phi^*)\partial_\mu \phi -m^2 \phi^* \phi = \frac{1}{2}(-iv e^{-i\theta} \partial^\mu \theta)(iv e^{i\theta} \partial_\mu \theta) - m^2 v^2 ,$$

and thus

$$=\frac{v^2}{2}(\partial^\mu \theta)(\partial_\mu \theta) - m^2 v^2~.$$

Note that the constant term $m^2v^2$ in the Lagrangian density has no physical significance, and the other term in it is simply the kinetic term for a massless scalar.

The symmetry-induced conserved U(1) current is

$$J_\mu = v^2 \partial_\mu \theta ~.$$

The charge, Q, resulting from this current shifts θ and the ground state to a new, degenerate, ground state. Thus, a vacuum with 〈θ〉 = 0 will shift to a different vacuum with 〈θ〉 = ε. The current connects the original vacuum with the Nambu–Goldstone boson state, 〈0|J_{0}(0)|θ〉≠ 0.

In general, in a theory with several scalar fields, ϕ_{j}, the Nambu–Goldstone mode ϕ_{g} is massless, and parameterises the curve of possible (degenerate) vacuum states. Its hallmark under the broken symmetry transformation is nonvanishing vacuum expectation 〈δϕ_{g}〉, an order parameter, for vanishing 〈ϕ_{g}〉 = 0, at some ground state |0〉 chosen at the minimum of the potential, 〈∂V/∂ϕ_{i}〉 = 0. In principle the vacuum should be the minimum of the effective potential which takes into account quantum effects, however it is equal to the classical potential to first approximation. Symmetry dictates that all variations of the potential with respect to the fields in all symmetry directions vanish. The vacuum value of the first order variation in any direction vanishes as just seen; while the vacuum value of the second order variation must also vanish, as follows. Vanishing vacuum values of field symmetry transformation increments add no new information.

By contrast, however, nonvanishing vacuum expectations of transformation increments, 〈δϕ_{g}〉, specify the relevant (Goldstone) null eigenvectors of the mass matrix,

$\left\langle { \partial^2 V \over \partial \phi _i \partial \phi _j } \right\rangle \langle \delta \phi_j \rangle =0~,$

and hence the corresponding zero-mass eigenvalues.

== Goldstone's argument ==
The principle behind Goldstone's argument is that the ground state is not unique. Normally, by current conservation, the charge operator for any symmetry current is time-independent,

$${d\over dt} Q = {d\over dt} \int_x J^0(x) =0.$$

Acting with the charge operator on the vacuum either annihilates the vacuum, if that is symmetric; else, if not, as is the case in spontaneous symmetry breaking, it produces a zero-frequency state out of it, through its shift transformation feature illustrated above. Actually, here, the charge itself is ill-defined, cf. the Fabri–Picasso argument below.

But its better behaved commutators with fields, that is, the nonvanishing transformation shifts 〈δϕ_{g}〉, are, nevertheless, time-invariant,

$$\frac{d \langle \delta \phi_g \rangle }{dt} = 0,$$

thus generating a δ(k^{0}) in its Fourier transform. (This ensures that, inserting a complete set of intermediate states in a nonvanishing current commutator can lead to vanishing time-evolution only when one or more of these states is massless.)

Thus, if the vacuum is not invariant under the symmetry, action of the charge operator produces a state which is different from the vacuum chosen, but which has zero frequency. This is a long-wavelength oscillation of a field which is nearly stationary: there are physical states with zero frequency, k^{0}, so that the theory cannot have a mass gap.

This argument is further clarified by taking the limit carefully. If an approximate charge operator acting in a huge but finite region A is applied to the vacuum,

$${d\over dt} Q_A = {d\over dt} \int_x e^{-\frac{x^2}{2A^2}} J^0(x) = -\int_x e^{-\frac{x^2}{2A^2}} \nabla \cdot J = \int_x \nabla \left (e^{-\frac{x^2}{2A^2}} \right ) \cdot J,$$

a state with approximately vanishing time derivative is produced,

$$\left \| {d\over dt} Q_A |0\rangle \right \| \approx \frac{1}{A} \left \| Q_A|0\rangle\right  \|.$$

Assuming a nonvanishing mass gap m_{0}, the frequency of any state like the above, which is orthogonal to the vacuum, is at least m_{0},

$$\left \| \frac{d}{dt} |\theta\rangle \right \| = \| H |\theta\rangle \| \ge m_0 \||\theta\rangle \|.$$

Letting A become large leads to a contradiction. Consequently m_{0} = 0. However this argument fails when the symmetry is gauged, because then the symmetry generator is only performing a gauge transformation. A gauge transformed state is the same exact state, so that acting with a symmetry generator does not get one out of the vacuum (see Higgs mechanism).

Fabri–Picasso Theorem. Q does not properly exist in the Hilbert space, unless Q|0〉 = 0.

The argument requires both the vacuum and the charge Q to be translationally invariant, P|0〉 = 0, [P,Q]= 0.

Consider the correlation function of the charge with itself,

$$\begin{align}
\langle 0| QQ |0\rangle &= \int d^3x \langle0|j_0(x) Q|0\rangle  \\
&=\int d^3x \left \langle 0 \left |e^{iPx}  j_0(0) e^{-iPx} Q \right |0 \right \rangle \\
&=\int d^3x \left \langle 0 \left | e^{iPx}  j_0(0) e^{-iPx} Q e^{iPx} e^{-iPx} \right | 0 \right \rangle \\
&=\int d^3x \left \langle 0 \left | j_0(0)  Q \right |0 \right \rangle
\end{align}$$

so the integrand in the right hand side does not depend on the position.

Thus, its value is proportional to the total space volume, $\|Q|0\rangle \|^2 = \infty$ — unless the symmetry is unbroken, Q|0〉 = 0. Consequently, Q does not properly exist in the Hilbert space.

== Infraparticles ==
There is an arguable loophole in the theorem. If one reads the theorem carefully, it only states that there exist non-vacuum states with arbitrarily small energies. Take for example a chiral N = 1 super QCD model with a nonzero squark VEV which is conformal in the IR. The chiral symmetry is a global symmetry which is (partially) spontaneously broken. Some of the "Goldstone bosons" associated with this spontaneous symmetry breaking are charged under the unbroken gauge group and hence, these composite bosons have a continuous mass spectrum with arbitrarily small masses but yet there is no Goldstone boson with exactly zero mass. In other words, the Goldstone bosons are infraparticles.

== Extensions ==
=== Nonrelativistic theories ===
A version of Goldstone's theorem also applies to nonrelativistic theories. It essentially states that, for each spontaneously broken symmetry, there corresponds some quasiparticle which is typically a boson and has no energy gap. In condensed matter these goldstone bosons are also called gapless modes (i.e. states where the energy dispersion relation is like $E \propto p^n$ and is zero for $p=0$), the nonrelativistic version of the massless particles (i.e. photons where the dispersion relation is also $E=pc$ and zero for $p=0$). Note that the energy in the non relativistic condensed matter case is H−μN−α→⋅P→ and not H as it would be in a relativistic case. However, two different spontaneously broken generators may now give rise to the same Nambu–Goldstone boson.

As a first example an antiferromagnet has 2 goldstone bosons, a ferromagnet has 1 goldstone bosons, where in both cases we are breaking symmetry from SO(3) to SO(2), for the antiferromagnet the dispersion is $E \propto p$ and the expectation value of the ground state is zero, for the ferromagnet instead the dispersion is $E \propto p^2$ and the expectation value of the ground state is not zero, i.e. there is a spontaneously broken symmetry for the ground state

As a second example, in a superfluid, both the U(1) particle number symmetry and Galilean symmetry are spontaneously broken. However, the phonon is the Goldstone boson for both.

Still in regards to symmetry breaking there is also a close analogy between gapless modes in condensed matter and the Higgs boson, e.g. in the paramagnet to ferromagnet phase transition

=== Breaking of spacetime symmetries ===
In contrast to the case of the breaking of internal symmetries, when spacetime symmetries such as Lorentz, conformal, rotational, or translational symmetries are broken, the order parameter need not be a scalar field, but may be a tensor field, and the number of independent massless modes may be fewer than the number of spontaneously broken generators. For a theory with an order parameter $\langle \phi(\boldsymbol r)\rangle$ that spontaneously breaks a spacetime symmetry, the number of broken generators $T^a$ minus the number non-trivial independent solutions $c_a(\boldsymbol r)$ to

$$c_a(\boldsymbol r) T^a \langle \phi(\boldsymbol r)\rangle = 0$$

is the number of Goldstone modes that arise. For internal symmetries, the above equation has no non-trivial solutions, so the usual Goldstone theorem holds. When solutions do exist, this is because the Goldstone modes are linearly dependent among themselves, in that the resulting mode can be expressed as a gradients of another mode. Since the spacetime dependence of the solutions $c_a(\boldsymbol r)$ is in the direction of the unbroken generators, when all translation generators are broken, no non-trivial solutions exist and the number of Goldstone modes is once again exactly the number of broken generators.

In general, the phonon is effectively the Nambu–Goldstone boson for spontaneously broken translation symmetry.

== Nambu–Goldstone fermions ==
Spontaneously broken global fermionic symmetries, which occur in some supersymmetric models, lead to Nambu–Goldstone fermions, or goldstinos. These have spin 1 / 2 , instead of 0, and carry all quantum numbers of the respective supersymmetry generators broken spontaneously.

Spontaneous supersymmetry breaking smashes up ("reduces") supermultiplet structures into the characteristic nonlinear realizations of broken supersymmetry, so that goldstinos are superpartners of all particles in the theory, of any spin, and the only superpartners, at that. That is, to say, two non-goldstino particles are connected to only goldstinos through supersymmetry transformations, and not to each other, even if they were so connected before the breaking of supersymmetry. As a result, the masses and spin multiplicities of such particles are then arbitrary.

== See also ==
- Pseudo-Goldstone boson
- Majoron
- Higgs mechanism
- Mermin–Wagner theorem
- Vacuum expectation value
- Noether's theorem
