= Dirichlet's ellipsoidal problem =

Problem in hydrodynamics

In astrophysics, Dirichlet's ellipsoidal problem, named after Peter Gustav Lejeune Dirichlet, asks under what conditions there can exist an ellipsoidal configuration at all times of a homogeneous rotating fluid mass in which the motion, in an inertial frame, is a linear function of the coordinates. Dirichlet's basic idea was to reduce Euler equations to a system of ordinary differential equations such that the position of a fluid particle in a homogeneous ellipsoid at any time is a linear and homogeneous function of initial position of the fluid particle, using Lagrangian framework instead of the Eulerian framework.

== History ==
In the winter of 1856–57, Dirichlet found some solutions of Euler equations and he presented those in his lectures on partial differential equations in July 1857 and published the results in the same month. His work was left unfinished at his sudden death in 1859, but his notes were collated and published by Richard Dedekind posthumously in 1860.

Bernhard Riemann said, "In his posthumous paper, edited for publication by Dedekind, Dirichlet has opened up, in a most remarkable way, an entirely new avenue for investigations on the motion of a self-gravitating homogeneous ellipsoid. The further development of his beautiful discovery has a particular interest to the mathematician even apart from its relevance to the forms of heavenly bodies which initially instigated these investigations."

== Riemann–Lebovitz formulation ==
Dirichlet's problem is generalized by Bernhard Riemann in 1860 and by Norman R. Lebovitz in modern form in 1965. Let $a_1(t),\ a_2(t),\ a_3(t)$ be the semi-axes of the ellipsoid, which varies with time. Since the ellipsoid is homogeneous, the constancy of mass requires the constancy of the volume of the ellipsoid,

$$a_1(t)a_2(t)a_3(t) = a_1(0)a_2(0)a_3(0)$$

same as the initial volume. Consider an inertial frame $(X_1,X_2,X_3)$ and a rotating frame $(x_1,x_2,x_3)$, with $\mathbf{L}(t)$ being the linear transformation such that $\mathbf x=\mathbf L\mathbf X$ and it is clear that $\mathbf L$ is orthogonal, i.e., $\mathbf L\mathbf L^T=\mathbf L^T\mathbf L = \mathbf I$. We can define an anti-symmetric matrix with this,

$$\mathbf\Omega^* = \frac{d\mathbf L}{dt}\mathbf L^T$$

where we can write the dual $\mathbf\Omega$ of $\mathbf\Omega^*$ as $\Omega_{ij}^* = \varepsilon_{ijk}\Omega_k$ (and $2\Omega_i = \varepsilon_{ijk}\Omega_{jk}^*$), where $\mathbf\Omega(t)$ is nothing but the time-dependent rotation of the rotating frame with respect to the inertial frame.

Without loss of generality, let us assume that the inertial frame and the moving frame coincide initially, i.e., $\mathbf X(0) = \mathbf x(0)$. By definition, Dirichlet's problem is looking for a solution which is a linear function of initial condition $\mathbf X(0) = \mathbf x(0)$. Let us assume the following form,

$$X_i(t) = \sum_{j=1}^3 P_{ij}(t) \frac{x_j(0)}{a_j(0)}.$$

and we define a diagonal matrix $\mathbf A(t)$ with diagonal elements being the semi-axes of the ellipsoid, then above equation can be written in matrix form as

$$\mathbf X(t) = \mathbf P \mathbf A_0^{-1} \mathbf x(0)$$

where $\mathbf A_0 = \mathbf A(0)$. It can shown then that the matrix $\mathbf S=\mathbf A^{-1}\mathbf L\mathbf P$ transforms the vector $\mathbf A_0^{-1}\mathbf x(0)$ linearly to the same vector at any later time $\mathbf A^{-1}\mathbf x$, i.e., $\mathbf A^{-1}\mathbf x=\mathbf S\mathbf A_0^{-1}\mathbf x(0)$. From the definition of $\mathbf A$, we can realize the vector $\mathbf A^{-1}\mathbf x$ represents a unit normal on the surface of the ellipsoid (true only at the boundary) since a fluid element on the surface moves with the surface. Therefore, we see that $\mathbf S$ transforms one unit vector on the boundary to another unit vector on the boundary, in other words, it is orthogonal, i.e., $\mathbf S\mathbf S^T = \mathbf S^T\mathbf S=\mathbf I$. In a similar manner as before, we can define another anti-symmetric matrix as

$$\mathbf\Lambda^*= \frac{d\mathbf S}{dt}\mathbf S^T$$,

where its dual is defined as $\Lambda_{ij}^*=\varepsilon_{ijk}\Lambda_k$ (and $2\Lambda_i = \varepsilon_{ijk}\Lambda_{jk}^*$). The Dirichlet's ellipsoidal problem then reduces to finding whether the matrix $\mathbf P(t)$ exists that determines the vector $\mathbf X(t)$ and that it is expressible in terms of two orthogonal matrices as in $\mathbf P = \mathbf L^T\mathbf A\mathbf S$ where, further

$$\frac{d\mathbf S}{dt}= \mathbf\Lambda^*\mathbf S, \quad \frac{d\mathbf L}{dt}= \mathbf\Omega^*\mathbf L, \quad \mathbf S(0)=\mathbf L(0)=\mathbf I.$$

Let $\mathbf u=d\mathbf x/dt$ be the velocity field seen by the observer at rest in the moving frame, which can be regarded as the internal fluid motion since this excludes the uniform rotation seen by the inertial observer. This internal motion is found to given by

$$\mathbf u = \left(\mathbf A \mathbf\Lambda^* \mathbf A^{-1} + \frac{d\mathbf A}{dt}\mathbf A^{-1}\right) \mathbf x$$

whose components, explicitly, are given by

$$\begin{align}
u_1 & = \frac{a_1}{a_2}\Lambda_3 x_2 - \frac{a_1}{a_3}\Lambda_2 x_3 + \frac{1}{a_1}\frac{da_1}{dt}x_1,\\
u_2 & = \frac{a_2}{a_3}\Lambda_1 x_3 - \frac{a_2}{a_1}\Lambda_3 x_1 + \frac{1}{a_2}\frac{da_2}{dt}x_2,\\
u_3 & = \frac{a_3}{a_1}\Lambda_2 x_1 - \frac{a_3}{a_2}\Lambda_1 x_2 + \frac{1}{a_3}\frac{da_3}{dt}x_3.
\end{align}$$

These three components show that the internal motion is composed of two parts: one with a uniform vorticity $\boldsymbol{\zeta}$ with components

$$\zeta_k = -\frac{a_i^2+a_j^2}{a_ia_j}\Lambda_k,\quad (i\neq j\neq k\neq i).$$

and the other with a stagnation point flow, i.e., $(x_1d\ln a_1/dt,x_2d\ln a_2/dt,x_3d\ln a_3/dt)$. Particularly, the physical meaning of $\mathbf\Lambda$ can be seen to be attributed to the uniform-vorticity motion. The pressure is found to assume a quadratic form, as derived by the equation of motion (and using the vanishing condition at the surface) given by

$$p = p_c(t)\left(1-\sum_{i=1}^3\frac{x_i^2}{a_i^2}\right)$$

where $p_c(t)$ is the central pressure, so that $\nabla p = -2 p_c \mathbf A^{-2}\mathbf x$. Substituting this back in the equation of motion leads to

$$\begin{align}
& \frac{d^2\mathbf A}{dt^2} + \frac{d}{dt}(\mathbf A\mathbf\Lambda^*-\mathbf\Omega^*\mathbf A) + \frac{d\mathbf A}{dt}\mathbf\Lambda^* - \mathbf\Omega^*\frac{d\mathbf A}{dt} + \mathbf A\mathbf\Lambda^{*2} + \mathbf\Omega^{*2}\mathbf A -2\mathbf\Omega^*\mathbf A\mathbf\Lambda^* \\[8pt]
= {} & {-2}\pi G\rho \mathbf B\mathbf A + \frac{2p_c}{\rho}\mathbf A^{-1}
\end{align}$$

where $G$ is the gravitational constant and $\mathbf B$ is diagonal matrix, whose diagonal elements are given by

$$B_i = a_1 a_2 a_3 \int_0^\infty \frac{du}{(a_i^2+u)\Delta}, \quad \Delta^2 = (a_1^2+u)(a_2^2+u)(a_3^2+u).$$

The tensor momentum equation and the conservation of mass equation, i.e., $a_1a_2a_3=a_1(0)a_2(0)a_3(0)$ provides us with ten equations for the ten unknowns, $a_1,\ a_2,\ a_3,\ p_c,\ \mathbf{\Lambda},\ \mathbf{\Omega}.$

== Dedekind's theorem ==
It states that if a motion determined by $\mathbf X(t)=\mathbf P(t)\mathbf A_0^{-1} \mathbf x(0)$ is admissible under the conditions of Dirichlet's problem, then the motion determined by the transpose $\mathbf P^T$ of $\mathbf P$ is also admissible. In other words, the theorem can be stated as for any state of motions that preserves a ellipsoidal figure, there is an adjoint state of motions that preserves the same ellipsoidal figure.

By taking transpose of the tensor momentum equation, one sees that the role of $\mathbf\Lambda^*$ and $\mathbf\Omega^*$ are interchanged. If there is solution for $\mathbf A,\ \mathbf\Lambda^*,\ \mathbf\Omega^*$, then for the same $\mathbf A$, there exists another solution with the role of $\mathbf\Lambda^*$ and $\mathbf\Omega^*$ interchanged. But interchanging $\mathbf\Lambda^*$ and $\mathbf\Omega^*$ is equivalent to replacing $\mathbf P$ by $\mathbf P^T$. The following relations confirms the previous statement.

$$\mathbf P=\mathbf L^T\mathbf A\mathbf S$$

where, further

$$\frac{d\mathbf S}{dt} = \mathbf\Lambda^* \mathbf S,\quad \frac{d\mathbf L}{dt} = \mathbf\Omega^* \mathbf L, \quad \text{and} \quad \mathbf S(0)=\mathbf L(0) = \mathbf I.$$

The typical configuration of this theorem is the Jacobi ellipsoid and its adjoint is called as Dedekind ellipsoid, in other words, both ellipsoid have same shape, but their internal fluid motions are different.

== Integrals ==
The tensor momentum equation admits three integrals, with regards to conservation of energy, angular momentum and circulation. The energy integral is found to be

$$\frac{1}{2}\sum_{i=1}^3 \left(\frac{da_i}{dt}\right)^2 + \frac{1}{2}\sum_{i\neq j\neq k} (\Lambda_i^2+\Omega_i^2)(a_j^2+a_k^2) - 2 \sum_{i\neq j\neq k}  a_ia_j \Lambda_k \Omega_k - 2\pi G \rho I =\text{constant}$$

where

$$I = a_1a_2a_3 \int_0^\infty \frac{du}{\Delta}.$$

Next, we have the integral

$$\sum_{i\neq j\neq k}[(a_i^2+a_j^2)\Omega_k-2a_ia_j\Lambda_k]^2=\text{constant}$$

which signifies the conservation of $\mathbf L^2$, where the angular momentum components are given by

$$L_i = \frac{M}{5}[(a_j^2+a_k^2)\Omega_i-2a_ja_k\Lambda_i], \quad i\neq j\neq k$$

wherein $M$ is the total mass. Since the problem is invariant to the interchange of $\mathbf\Lambda^*$ and $\mathbf\Omega^*$, from the above integral, we obtain

$$\sum_{i\neq j\neq k}[(a_i^2+a_j^2)\Lambda_k-2a_ia_j\Omega_k]^2=\sum_{i\neq j\neq k}a_i^2a_j^2(2\Omega_k+\zeta_k)^2 =\text{constant}$$

where we substituted the formula for $\mathbf\Lambda$ in terms of the vorticity vector $\boldsymbol\zeta$. This integral signifies the conservation of $\mathbf\Gamma^2$, where the circulation components (in the inertial frame) are given by

$$\Gamma_k = \pi a_i a_j (2\Omega_k + \zeta_k), \quad i\neq j\neq k.$$

== See also ==
- Maclaurin ellipsoid
- Jacobi ellipsoid
