= Stueckelberg action =

Special case of the abelian Higgs mechanism

In field theory, the Stueckelberg action (named after Ernst Stueckelberg) describes a massive spin-1 field as an R (the real numbers are the Lie algebra of U(1)) Yang–Mills theory coupled to a real scalar field $\phi$. This scalar field takes on values in a real 1D affine representation of R with $m$ as the coupling strength.

$$\mathcal{L}=-\frac{1}{4}(\partial^\mu A^\nu-\partial^\nu A^\mu)(\partial_\mu A_\nu-\partial_\nu A_\mu)+\frac{1}{2}(\partial^\mu \phi+m A^\mu)(\partial_\mu \phi+m A_\mu)$$

This is a special case of the Higgs mechanism, where λ and thus the mass of the Higgs scalar excitation has been taken to infinity, so the Higgs has decoupled and can be ignored, resulting in a nonlinear, affine representation of the field, instead of a linear representation — in contemporary terminology, a U(1) nonlinear σ-model.

Gauge-fixing $\phi=0$, yields the Proca action.

This explains why, unlike the case for non-abelian vector fields, quantum electrodynamics with a massive photon is, in fact, renormalizable, even though it is not manifestly gauge invariant (after the Stückelberg scalar has been eliminated in the Proca action).

== Stueckelberg extension of the Standard Model ==
The Stueckelberg extension of the Standard Model (StSM) consists of a gauge invariant kinetic term for a massive U(1) gauge field. Such a term can be implemented into the Lagrangian of the Standard Model without destroying the renormalizability of the theory and further provides a mechanism for mass generation that is distinct from the Higgs mechanism in the context of Abelian gauge theories.

The model involves a non-trivial mixing of the Stueckelberg and the Standard Model sectors by including an additional term in the effective Lagrangian of the Standard Model given by

$$\mathcal{L}_{\rm St}=-\frac{1}{4}C_{\mu  \nu  }C^{\mu\nu }+g_XC_{\mu }\mathcal{J}_X^{\mu }-\frac{1}{2}\left(\partial _{\mu }\sigma +M_1C_{\mu}+M_2B_{\mu }\right)^2.$$

The first term above is the Stueckelberg field strength, $M_1$ and $M_2$ are topological mass parameters and $\sigma$ is the axion. After symmetry breaking in the electroweak sector the photon remains massless. The model predicts a new type of gauge boson dubbed $Z'_{\rm St}$ which inherits a very distinct narrow decay width in this model. The St sector of the StSM decouples from the SM in limit $M_2/M_1 \to 0$.

Stueckelberg type couplings arise quite naturally in theories involving compactifications of higher-dimensional string theory, in particular, these couplings appear in the dimensional reduction of the ten-dimensional N = 1 supergravity coupled to supersymmetric Yang–Mills gauge fields in the presence of internal gauge fluxes. In the context of intersecting D-brane model building, products of U(N) gauge groups are broken to their SU(N) subgroups via the Stueckelberg couplings and thus the Abelian gauge fields become massive. Further, in a much simpler fashion one may consider a model with only one extra dimension (a type of Kaluza–Klein model) and compactify down to a four-dimensional theory. The resulting Lagrangian will contain massive vector gauge bosons that acquire masses through the Stueckelberg mechanism.

== See also ==
- Higgs mechanism#Affine Higgs mechanism
