= Jordan's totient function =

Arithmetical function

In number theory, Jordan's totient function, denoted as $J_k(n)$, where $k$ is a positive integer, is a function of a positive integer, $n$, that equals the number of $k$-tuples of positive integers that are less than or equal to $n$ and that together with $n$ form a coprime set of $k+1$ integers.

Jordan's totient function is a generalization of Euler's totient function, which is the same as $J_1(n)$. The function is named after Camille Jordan.

== Definition ==
For each positive integer $k$, Jordan's totient function $J_k$ is multiplicative and may be evaluated as

$J_k(n)=n^k \prod_{p|n}\left(1-\frac{1}{p^k}\right) \,$, where $p$ ranges through the prime divisors of $n$.

== Properties ==
- $\sum_{d | n } J_k(d) = n^k. \,$

which may be written in the language of Dirichlet convolutions as

$$J_k(n) \star 1 = n^k\,$$

and via Möbius inversion as

$$J_k(n) = \mu(n) \star n^k$$.

Since the Dirichlet generating function of $\mu$ is $1/\zeta(s)$ and the Dirichlet generating function of $n^k$ is $\zeta(s-k)$, the series for $J_k$ becomes

$$\sum_{n\ge 1}\frac{J_k(n)}{n^s} = \frac{\zeta(s-k)}{\zeta(s)}$$.

- An average order of $J_k(n)$ is

$$J_k(n) \sim \frac{n^k}{\zeta(k+1)}$$.

- The Dedekind psi function is

$$\psi(n) = \frac{J_2(n)}{J_1(n)}$$,

and by inspection of the definition (recognizing that each factor in the product over the primes is a cyclotomic polynomial of $p^{-k}$), the arithmetic functions defined by $\frac{J_k(n)}{J_1(n)}$ or $\frac{J_{2k}(n)}{J_k(n)}$ can also be shown to be integer-valued multiplicative functions.

- $\sum_{\delta\mid n}\delta^sJ_r(\delta)J_s\left(\frac{n}{\delta}\right) = J_{r+s}(n)$.

== Order of matrix groups ==
- The general linear group of matrices of order $m$ over $\mathbf{Z}/n$ has order

$$|\operatorname{GL}(m,\mathbf{Z}/n)|=n^{\frac{m(m-1)}{2}}\prod_{k=1}^m J_k(n).$$

- The special linear group of matrices of order $m$ over $\mathbf{Z}/n$ has order

$$|\operatorname{SL}(m,\mathbf{Z}/n)|=n^{\frac{m(m-1)}{2}}\prod_{k=2}^m J_k(n).$$

- The symplectic group of matrices of order $m$ over $\mathbf{Z}/n$ has order

$$|\operatorname{Sp}(2m,\mathbf{Z}/n)|=n^{m^2}\prod_{k=1}^m J_{2k}(n).$$

The first two formulas were discovered by Jordan.

== Examples ==
- Explicit lists in the OEIS are J_{2} in OEIS: A007434, J_{3} in OEIS: A059376, J_{4} in OEIS: A059377, J_{5} in OEIS: A059378, J_{6} up to J_{10} in OEIS: A069091 up to OEIS: A069095.
- Multiplicative functions defined by ratios are J_{2}(n)/J_{1}(n) in OEIS: A001615, J_{3}(n)/J_{1}(n) in OEIS: A160889, J_{4}(n)/J_{1}(n) in OEIS: A160891, J_{5}(n)/J_{1}(n) in OEIS: A160893, J_{6}(n)/J_{1}(n) in OEIS: A160895, J_{7}(n)/J_{1}(n) in OEIS: A160897, J_{8}(n)/J_{1}(n) in OEIS: A160908, J_{9}(n)/J_{1}(n) in OEIS: A160953, J_{10}(n)/J_{1}(n) in OEIS: A160957, J_{11}(n)/J_{1}(n) in OEIS: A160960.
- Examples of the ratios J_{2k}(n)/J_{k}(n) are J_{4}(n)/J_{2}(n) in OEIS: A065958, J_{6}(n)/J_{3}(n) in OEIS: A065959, and J_{8}(n)/J_{4}(n) in OEIS: A065960.
