= Richard Dedekind =

German mathematician (1831–1916)

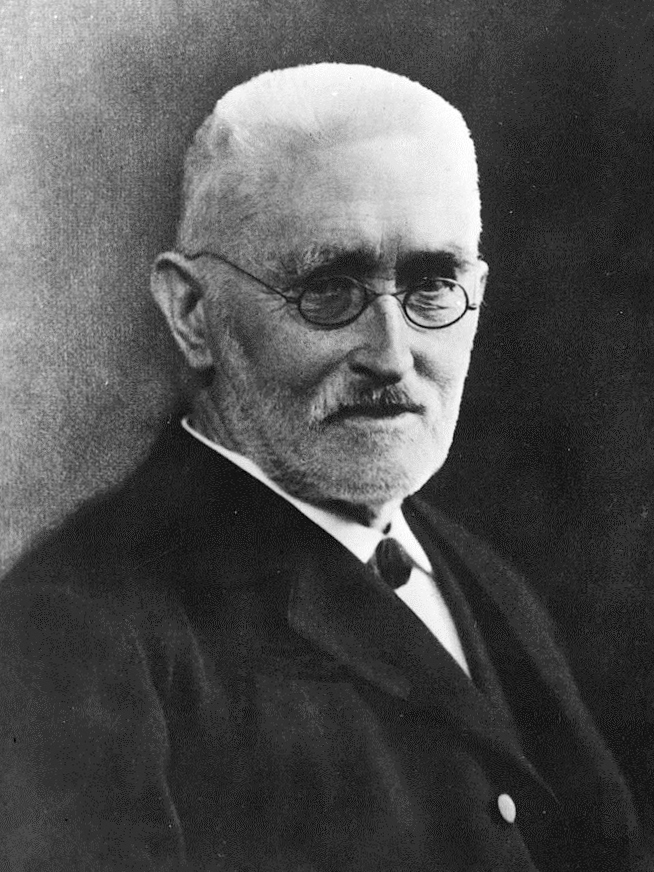
- Born: 6 October 1831; Braunschweig, Duchy of Brunswick
- Died: 12 February 1916 (aged 84); Braunschweig, German Empire
- Education: Collegium Carolinum; University of Göttingen
- Known for: Dedekind cut Dedekind-Peano axioms Dedekind's theorem Dedekind domains Abstract algebra Algebraic number theory Real numbers Logicism
- Scientific career
- Fields: Mathematics; Philosophy of mathematics
- Doctoral advisor: Carl Friedrich Gauss

Signature
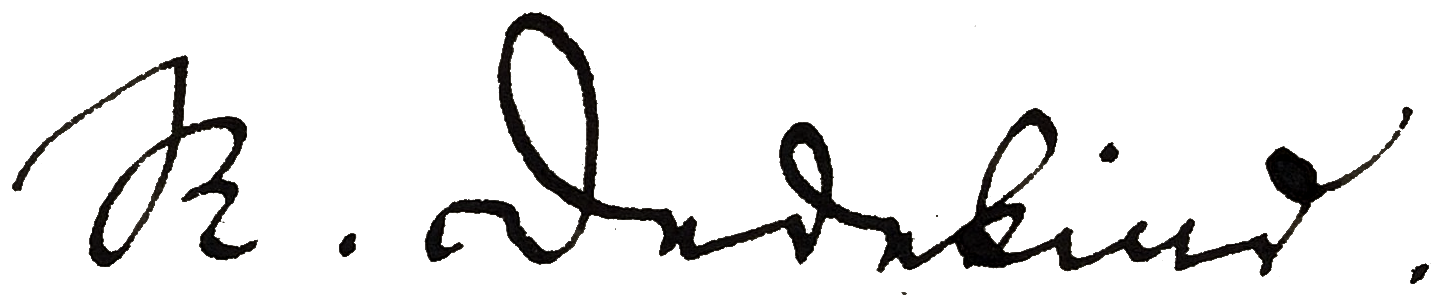

Julius Wilhelm Richard Dedekind (/ˈdeɪdɪkɪnd/; German: [ˈdeːdəˌkɪnt]; 6 October 1831 – 12 February 1916) was a German mathematician who made important contributions to number theory, abstract algebra (particularly ring theory), and the axiomatic foundations of arithmetic. His best known contribution is the definition of real numbers through the notion of Dedekind cut. He is also considered a pioneer in the development of modern set theory and of the philosophy of mathematics known as logicism.

== Life ==
Dedekind's father was Julius Levin Ulrich Dedekind, an administrator of Collegium Carolinum in Braunschweig. His mother was Caroline Henriette Dedekind (née Emperius), the daughter of a professor at the Collegium. Richard Dedekind had three older siblings. As an adult, he never used the names Julius Wilhelm. He was born in Braunschweig (often called "Brunswick" in English), which is where he lived most of his life and died. His body rests at Braunschweig Main Cemetery.

He first attended the Collegium Carolinum in 1848 before transferring to the University of Göttingen in 1850. There, Dedekind was taught number theory by professor Moritz Stern. Gauss was still teaching, although mostly at an elementary level, and Dedekind became his last student. Dedekind received his doctorate in 1852, for a thesis titled Über die Theorie der Eulerschen Integrale ("On the Theory of Eulerian integrals"). This thesis did not display the talent evident in Dedekind's subsequent publications.

At that time, the University of Berlin, not Göttingen, was the main facility for mathematical research in Germany. Thus Dedekind went to Berlin for two years of study, where he and Bernhard Riemann were contemporaries; they were both awarded the habilitation in 1854. Dedekind returned to Göttingen to teach as a Privatdozent, giving courses on probability and geometry. He studied for a while with Peter Gustav Lejeune Dirichlet, and they became good friends. Because of lingering weaknesses in his mathematical knowledge, he studied elliptic and abelian functions. Yet he was also the first at Göttingen to lecture concerning Galois theory. About this time, he became one of the first people to understand the importance of the notion of groups for algebra and arithmetic.

In 1858, he began teaching at the Polytechnic school in Zürich (now ETH Zürich). When the Collegium Carolinum was upgraded to a Technische Hochschule (Institute of Technology) in 1862, Dedekind returned to his native Braunschweig, where he spent the rest of his life, teaching at the Institute. He retired in 1894, but did occasional teaching and continued to publish. He never married, instead living with his sister Julia.

Dedekind was elected to the Academies of Berlin (1880) and Rome, and to the French Academy of Sciences (1900). He received honorary doctorates from the universities of Oslo, Zurich, and Braunschweig.

== Work ==
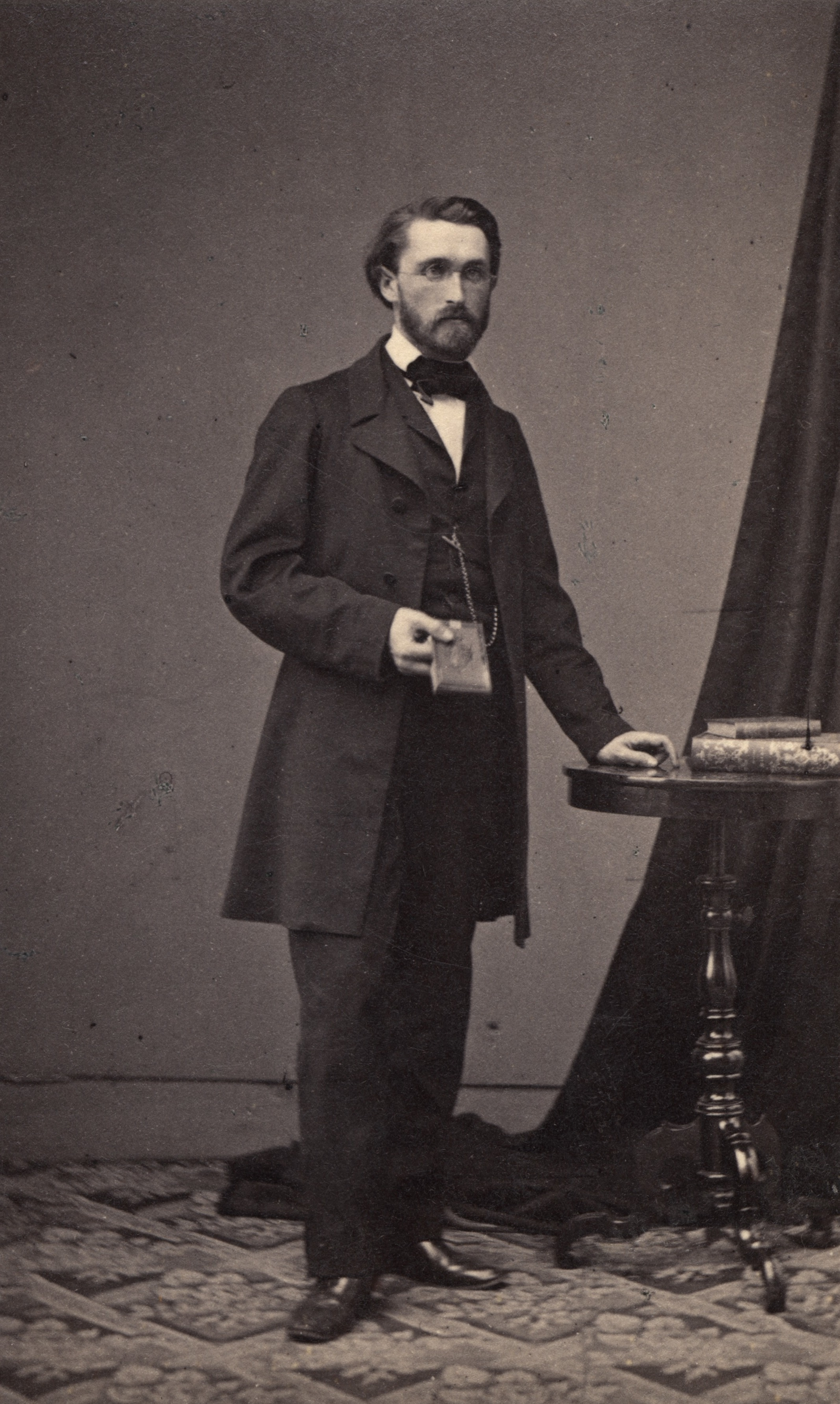
Dedekind, before 1886

While teaching calculus for the first time at the Polytechnic school, Dedekind developed the notion now known as a Dedekind cut (German: Schnitt), now a standard definition of the real numbers. The idea of a cut is that an irrational number divides the rational numbers into two classes (sets), with all the numbers of one class (greater) being strictly greater than all the numbers of the other (lesser) class. For example, the square root of 2 defines all the nonnegative numbers whose squares are less than 2 and the negative numbers into the lesser class, and the positive numbers whose squares are greater than 2 into the greater class. Every location on the number line continuum contains either a rational or an irrational number. Thus there are no empty locations, gaps, or discontinuities. Dedekind published his thoughts on irrational numbers and Dedekind cuts in his pamphlet "Stetigkeit und irrationale Zahlen" ("Continuity and irrational numbers"); in modern terminology, Vollständigkeit, completeness.

Dedekind defined two sets to be "similar" when there exists a one-to-one correspondence between them. He invoked similarity to give the first precise definition of an infinite set: a set is infinite when it is "similar to a proper part of itself," in modern terminology, is equinumerous to one of its proper subsets. Thus the set N of natural numbers can be shown to be similar to the subset of N whose members are the squares of every member of N, (N → N^{2}):

N    1  2  3  4  5  6  7  8  9  10 ...
             ↓           
N2   1  4  9  16 25 36 49 64 81 100 ...

Dedekind's work in this area anticipated that of Georg Cantor, who is commonly considered the founder of set theory. Likewise, his contributions to the foundations of mathematics anticipated later works by major proponents of logicism, such as Gottlob Frege and Bertrand Russell.

Dedekind edited the collected works of Lejeune Dirichlet, Gauss, and Riemann. Dedekind's study of Lejeune Dirichlet's work led him to his later study of algebraic number fields and ideals. In 1863, he published Lejeune Dirichlet's lectures on number theory as Vorlesungen über Zahlentheorie ("Lectures on Number Theory") about which it has been written that:

Although the book is assuredly based on Dirichlet's lectures, and although Dedekind himself referred to the book throughout his life as Dirichlet's, the book itself was entirely written by Dedekind, for the most part after Dirichlet's death.

— Edwards, 1983

It was in this time frame that he had developed the Dedekind cut in 1872. The 1879 and 1894 editions of the Vorlesungen included supplements introducing the notion of an ideal, fundamental to ring theory. (The word "Ring", introduced later by Hilbert, does not appear in Dedekind's work.) Dedekind defined an ideal as a subset of a set of numbers, composed of algebraic integers that satisfy polynomial equations with integer coefficients. The concept underwent further development in the hands of Hilbert and, especially, of Emmy Noether. Ideals generalize Ernst Eduard Kummer's ideal numbers, devised as part of Kummer's 1843 attempt to prove Fermat's Last Theorem. (Thus Dedekind can be said to have been Kummer's most important disciple.) In an 1882 article, Dedekind and Heinrich Martin Weber applied ideals to Riemann surfaces, giving an algebraic proof of the Riemann–Roch theorem.

In 1888, he published a short monograph titled Was sind und was sollen die Zahlen? ("What are numbers and what are they good for?" Ewald 1996: 790), which included his definition of an infinite set. He also proposed an axiomatic foundation for the natural numbers, whose primitive notions were the number one and the successor function. The next year, Giuseppe Peano, citing Dedekind, formulated an equivalent but simpler set of axioms, now the standard ones.

Dedekind made other contributions to algebra. For instance, around 1900, he wrote the first papers on modular lattices. In 1872, while on holiday in Interlaken, Dedekind met Georg Cantor. Dedekind assisted with Cantor's disputes with Leopold Kronecker, who was philosophically opposed to Cantor's transfinite numbers. Recent findings of past correspondences indicate Cantor plagiarized Dedekind's proof on infinity and resulted in a fractured friendship.

== Bibliography ==
Primary literature in English:

- 1890. "Letter to Keferstein" in Jean van Heijenoort, 1967. A Source Book in Mathematical Logic, 1879–1931. Harvard Univ. Press: 98–103.
- 1963 (1901). Essays on the Theory of Numbers. Beman, W. W., ed. and trans. Dover. Contains English translations of Stetigkeit und irrationale Zahlen and Was sind und was sollen die Zahlen?
- 1996. Theory of Algebraic Integers. Stillwell, John, ed. and trans. Cambridge Uni. Press. A translation of Über die Theorie der ganzen algebraischen Zahlen.
- Ewald, William B., ed., 1996. From Kant to Hilbert: A Source Book in the Foundations of Mathematics, 2 vols. Oxford Uni. Press.
  - 1854. "On the introduction of new functions in mathematics," 754–61.
  - 1872. "Continuity and irrational numbers," 765–78. (translation of Stetigkeit...)
  - 1888. What are numbers and what should they be?, 787–832. (translation of Was sind und...)
  - 1872–82, 1899. Correspondence with Cantor, 843–77, 930–40.

Primary literature in German:

- Gesammelte mathematische Werke (Complete mathematical works, Vol. 1–3). Retrieved 5 August 2009.

== See also ==
- List of things named after Richard Dedekind
- Dedekind cut
- Dedekind domain
- Dedekind eta function
- Dedekind-infinite set
- Dedekind number
- Dedekind psi function
- Dedekind sum
- Dedekind zeta function
- Ideal (ring theory)
