= Explicit symmetry breaking =

Symmetry breaking in physics

In theoretical physics, explicit symmetry breaking is the breaking of a symmetry of a theory by terms in its defining equations of motion (most typically, to the Lagrangian or the Hamiltonian) that do not respect the symmetry. Usually this term is used in situations where these symmetry-breaking terms are small, so that the symmetry is approximately respected by the theory. An example is the spectral line splitting in the Zeeman effect, due to a magnetic interaction perturbation in the Hamiltonian of the atoms involved.

Explicit symmetry breaking differs from spontaneous symmetry breaking. In the latter, the defining equations respect the symmetry but the ground state (vacuum) of the theory breaks it.

Explicit symmetry breaking is also associated with electromagnetic radiation. A system of accelerated charges results in electromagnetic radiation when the geometric symmetry of the electric field in free space is explicitly broken by the associated electrodynamic structure under time varying excitation of the given system. This is quite evident in an antenna where the electric lines of field curl around or have rotational geometry around the radiating terminals in contrast to linear geometric orientation within a pair of transmission lines which does not radiate even under time varying excitation. The broken symmetry of electric lines of field in a radiating system is directly associated with electrodynamic symmetry breaking of the antenna, which consists of flared lines or capacitor-inductor system with one end floating in free space.

== Perturbation theory in quantum mechanics ==
A common setting for explicit symmetry breaking is perturbation theory in quantum mechanics. The symmetry is evident in a base Hamiltonian $H_0$. This $H_0$ is often an integrable Hamiltonian, admitting symmetries which in some sense make the Hamiltonian integrable. The base Hamiltonian might be chosen to provide a starting point close to the system being modelled.

Mathematically, the symmetries can be described by a smooth symmetry group $G$. Under the action of this group, $H_0$ is invariant. The explicit symmetry breaking then comes from a second term in the Hamiltonian, $H_{\text{int}}$, which is not invariant under the action of $G$. This is sometimes interpreted as an interaction of the system with itself or possibly with an externally applied field. It is often chosen to contain a factor of a small interaction parameter.

The Hamiltonian can then be written

$$H = H_0 + H_{\text{int}}$$

where $H_{\text{int}}$ is the term which explicitly breaks the symmetry. The resulting equations of motion will also not have $G$-symmetry.

A typical question in perturbation theory might then be to determine the spectrum of the system to first order in the perturbative interaction parameter.

== See also ==
- Symmetry breaking
