= Higgs mechanism =

Mechanism that explains the generation of mass for gauge bosons

In the Standard Model of particle physics, the Higgs mechanism is essential to explain the generation mechanism of the property "mass" for gauge bosons. Without the Higgs mechanism, all bosons (one of the two classes of particles, the other being fermions) would be considered massless, but measurements show that the W^{+}, W^{−}, and Z^{0} bosons actually have relatively large masses of around 80 GeV/c^{2} (in comparison to other particles like protons and neutrons, at about 1 GeV/c^{2}). The Higgs field resolves this conundrum. The simplest description of the mechanism adds to the Standard Model a quantum field (the Higgs field), which permeates all of space. Below some extremely high temperature, the field causes spontaneous symmetry breaking during interactions. The breaking of symmetry triggers the Higgs mechanism, causing the bosons with which it interacts to have mass. In the Standard Model, the phrase "Higgs mechanism" refers specifically to the generation of masses for the W^{±}, and Z weak gauge bosons through electroweak symmetry breaking. The Large Hadron Collider at CERN announced results consistent with the Higgs particle on 14 March 2013, making it extremely likely that the field, or one like it, exists, and explaining how the Higgs mechanism takes place in nature. This was first theorized by researchers at the University of Alberta.

The view of the Higgs mechanism as involving spontaneous symmetry breaking of a gauge symmetry is technically incorrect since by Elitzur's theorem gauge symmetries never can be spontaneously broken. Rather, the Fröhlich–Morchio–Strocchi mechanism reformulates the Higgs mechanism in an entirely gauge invariant way, generally leading to the same results.

The mechanism was proposed in 1962 by Philip Warren Anderson, following work in the late 1950s on symmetry breaking in superconductivity and a 1960 paper by Yoichiro Nambu that discussed its application within particle physics.

A theory able to finally explain mass generation without "breaking" gauge theory was published almost simultaneously by three independent groups in 1964: by Robert Brout and François Englert; by Peter Higgs; and by Gerald Guralnik, C. R. Hagen, and Tom Kibble. The Higgs mechanism is therefore also called the Brout–Englert–Higgs mechanism, or Englert–Brout–Higgs–Guralnik–Hagen–Kibble mechanism, Anderson–Higgs mechanism, Anderson–Higgs–Kibble mechanism, Higgs–Kibble mechanism by Abdus Salam and ABEGHHK'tH mechanism (for Anderson, Brout, Englert, Guralnik, Hagen, Higgs, Kibble, and 't Hooft) by Peter Higgs. The Higgs mechanism in electrodynamics was also discovered independently by Eberly and Reiss in reverse as the "gauge" Dirac field mass gain due to the artificially displaced electromagnetic field as a Higgs field.

On 8 October 2013, following the discovery at CERN's Large Hadron Collider of a new particle that appeared to be the long-sought Higgs boson predicted by the theory, it was announced that Peter Higgs and François Englert had been awarded the 2013 Nobel Prize in Physics. (Note: Englert's co-author Robert Brout had died in 2011; the Nobel Prize is not usually awarded posthumously.)

== Standard Model ==
The Higgs mechanism was incorporated into modern particle physics by Steven Weinberg and Abdus Salam, and is an essential part of the Standard Model.

In the Standard Model, at temperatures high enough that electroweak symmetry is unbroken, all elementary particles are massless. At a critical temperature, the Higgs field develops a vacuum expectation value; some theories suggest the symmetry is spontaneously broken by tachyon condensation, and the W and Z bosons acquire masses (also called "electroweak symmetry breaking", or EWSB). In the history of the universe, this is believed to have happened about a picosecond (10^{−12} s) after the hot big bang, when the universe was at a temperature of 159.5±1.5 GeV/k_{B}.

Fermions, such as the leptons and quarks in the Standard Model, can also acquire mass as a result of their interaction with the Higgs field, but not in the same way as the gauge bosons.

=== Structure of the Higgs field ===
In the Standard Model, the Higgs field is an SU(2) doublet (i.e. the standard representation with two complex components called isospin), which is a scalar under Lorentz transformations. Its electric charge is zero; its weak isospin is 1/2 and the third component of weak isospin is −1/2; and its weak hypercharge (the charge for the U(1) gauge group defined up to an arbitrary multiplicative constant) is 1. Under U(1) rotations, it is multiplied by a phase, which thus mixes the real and imaginary parts of the complex spinor into each other, combining to the standard two-component complex representation of the group U(2).

The Higgs field, through the interactions specified (summarized, represented, or even simulated) by its potential, induces spontaneous breaking of three out of the four generators ("directions") of the gauge group U(2). This is often written as SU(2)_{L} × U(1)_{Y}, (which is strictly speaking only the same on the level of infinitesimal symmetries) because the diagonal phase factor also acts on other fields – quarks in particular. Three out of its four components would ordinarily resolve as Goldstone bosons, if they were not coupled to gauge fields.

However, after symmetry breaking, these three of the four degrees of freedom in the Higgs field mix with the three W and Z bosons (W^{+}, W^{−} and Z^{0}), and are only observable as components of these weak bosons, which are made massive by their inclusion; only the single remaining degree of freedom becomes a new scalar particle: the Higgs boson. The components that do not mix with Goldstone bosons form a massless photon.

=== The photon as the part that remains massless ===
The gauge group of the electroweak part of the standard model is SU(2)_{L} × U(1)_{Y}. The group SU(2) is the group of all 2-by-2 unitary matrices with unit determinant; all the orthonormal changes of coordinates in a complex two dimensional vector space.

Rotating the coordinates so that the second basis vector points in the direction of the Higgs boson makes the vacuum expectation value of H the spinor (0, v). The generators for rotations about the x-, y-, and z-axes are by half the Pauli matrices σ_{x}, σ_{y}, and σ_{z}, so that a rotation of angle θ about the z-axis takes the vacuum to

$$\ \Bigl(\ 0\ ,\ v\ e^{-\tfrac{ 1 }{ 2 }\ i\ \theta}\ \Bigr) ~.$$

While the T_{x} and T_{y} generators mix up the top and bottom components of the spinor, the T_{z} rotations only multiply each by opposite phases. This phase can be undone by a U(1) rotation of angle 1 / 2 θ. Consequently, under both an SU(2) T_{z}-rotation and a U(1) rotation by an amount 1 / 2 θ, the vacuum is invariant.

This combination of generators

$$\ Q = T_3 + \tfrac{\ 1\ }{ 2 }\ Y_\mathsf{W}\$$

defines the unbroken part of the gauge group, where Q is the electric charge, T_{3} is the generator of rotations around the 3-axis in the adjoint representation of SU(2) and Y_{W} is the weak hypercharge generator of the U(1). This combination of generators (a 3 rotation in the SU(2) and a simultaneous U(1) rotation by half the angle) preserves the vacuum, and defines the unbroken gauge group in the standard model, namely the electric charge group. The part of the gauge field in this direction stays massless, and amounts to the physical photon. By contrast, the broken trace-orthogonal charge $\ T_3 - \tfrac{\ 1\ }{ 2 }\ Y_\mathsf{W} = 2\ T_3 - Q\$ couples to the massive Z^{0} boson.

=== Consequences for fermions ===
In spite of the introduction of spontaneous symmetry breaking, the mass terms preclude chiral gauge invariance. For these fields, the mass terms should always be replaced by a gauge-invariant "Higgs" mechanism. One possibility is some kind of Yukawa coupling (see below) between the fermion field ψ and the Higgs field $\phi$, with unknown couplings G_{ψ}, which after symmetry breaking (more precisely: after expansion of the Lagrange density around a suitable ground state) again results in the original mass terms, which are now, however (i.e., by introduction of the Higgs field) written in a gauge-invariant way. The Lagrange density for the Yukawa interaction of a fermion field ψ and the Higgs field $\phi$ is

$$\ \mathcal{L}_{\mathrm{Fermion}}(\phi, A, \psi) ~=~ \overline{\psi}\ \gamma^{\mu}\ D_{\mu}\ \psi ~+~ G_{\psi}\ \overline{\psi}\ \phi\ \psi\ ,$$

where again the gauge field A only enters via the gauge covariant derivative operator D_{μ} (i.e., it is only indirectly visible). The quantities γ_{μ} are the Dirac matrices, and G_{ψ} is the already-mentioned Yukawa coupling parameter for ψ. Now the mass-generation follows the same principle as above, namely from the existence of a finite expectation value $\vert\langle\phi\rangle\vert$. Again, this is crucial for the existence of the property mass.

== History of research ==
=== Background ===
Spontaneous symmetry breaking offered a framework to introduce bosons into relativistic quantum field theories. However, according to Goldstone's theorem, these bosons should be massless. The only observed particles which could be approximately interpreted as Goldstone bosons were the pions, which Yoichiro Nambu related to chiral symmetry breaking.

A similar problem arises with Yang–Mills theory (also known as non-abelian gauge theory), which predicts massless spin-1 gauge bosons. Massless weakly-interacting gauge bosons lead to long-range forces, which are only observed for electromagnetism and the corresponding massless photon. Gauge theories of the weak force needed a way to describe massive gauge bosons in order to be consistent.

=== Discovery ===
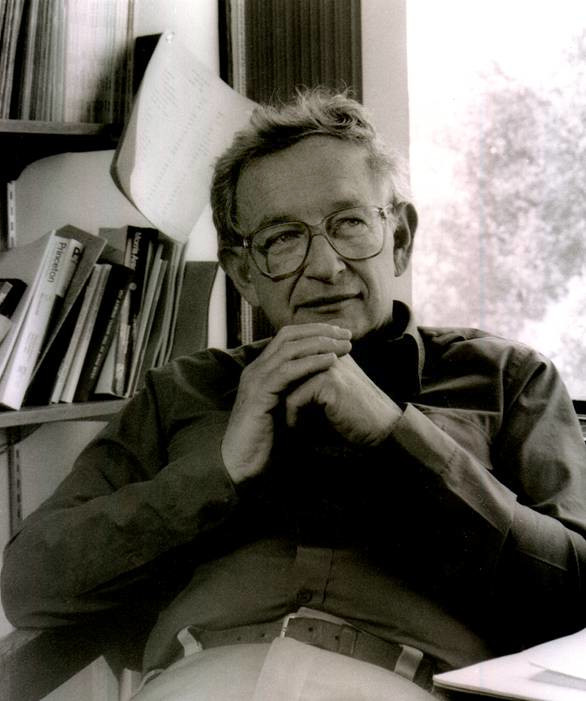
Philip W. Anderson, the first to implement the mechanism in 1962.

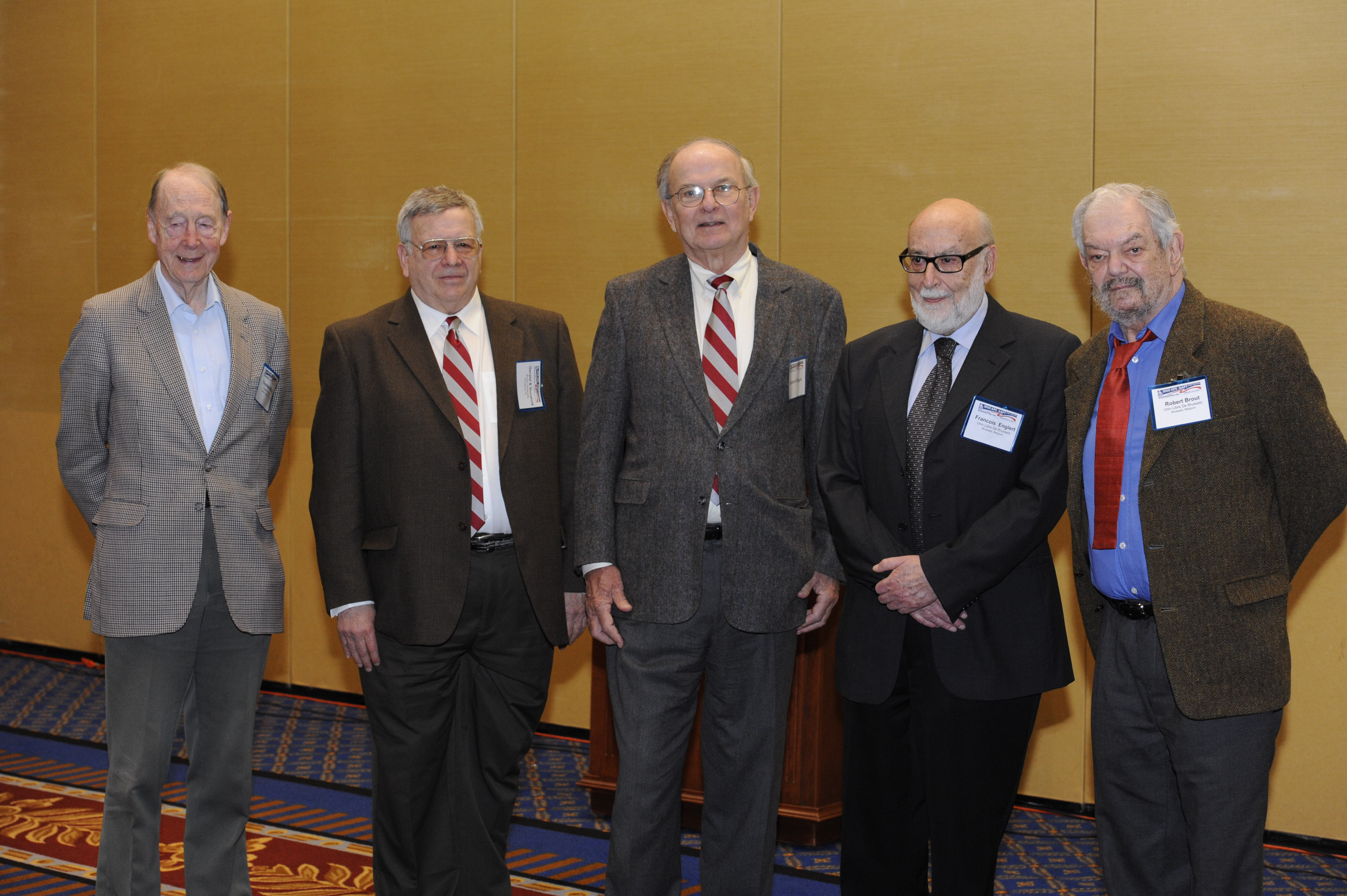
Five of the six 2010 APS Sakurai Prize Winners – (L to R) Tom Kibble, Gerald Guralnik, Carl Richard Hagen, François Englert, and Robert Brout

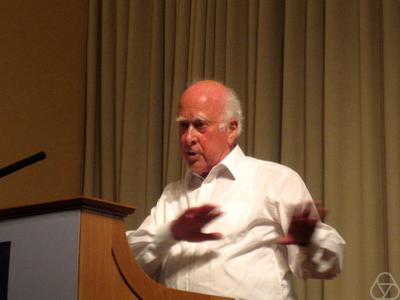
Peter Higgs in 2009

That breaking gauge symmetries did not lead to massless particles was observed in 1961 by Julian Schwinger, but he did not demonstrate massive particles would eventuate. This was done in Philip Warren Anderson's 1962 paper but only in non-relativistic field theory; it also discussed consequences for particle physics but did not work out an explicit relativistic model. The relativistic model was developed in 1964 by three independent groups:

- Robert Brout and François Englert
- Peter Higgs
- Gerald Guralnik, Carl Richard Hagen, and Tom Kibble.

Slightly later, in 1965, but independently from the other publications the mechanism was also proposed by Alexander Migdal and Alexander Polyakov, at that time Soviet undergraduate students. However, their paper was delayed by the editorial office of JETP, and was published late, in 1966.

The mechanism is closely analogous to phenomena previously discovered by Yoichiro Nambu involving the "vacuum structure" of quantum fields in superconductivity. A similar but distinct effect (involving an affine realization of what is now recognized as the Higgs field), known as the Stueckelberg mechanism, had previously been studied by Ernst Stueckelberg.

These physicists discovered that when a gauge theory is combined with an additional field that spontaneously breaks the symmetry group, the gauge bosons can consistently acquire a nonzero mass. In spite of the large values involved (see below) this permits a gauge theory description of the weak force, which was independently developed by Steven Weinberg and Abdus Salam in 1967. Higgs's original article presenting the model was rejected by Physics Letters. When revising the article before resubmitting it to Physical Review Letters, he added a sentence at the end, mentioning that it implies the existence of one or more new, massive scalar bosons, which do not form complete representations of the symmetry group; these are the Higgs bosons.

The three papers by Brout and Englert; Higgs; and Guralnik, Hagen, and Kibble were each recognized as "milestone letters" by Physical Review Letters in 2008. While each of these seminal papers took similar approaches, the contributions and differences among the 1964 PRL symmetry breaking papers are noteworthy. All six physicists were jointly awarded the 2010 J. J. Sakurai Prize for Theoretical Particle Physics for this work.

Benjamin W. Lee is often credited with first naming the "Higgs-like" mechanism, although there is debate around when this first occurred. One of the first times the Higgs name appeared in print was in 1972 when Gerardus 't Hooft and Martinus J. G. Veltman referred to it as the "Higgs–Kibble mechanism" in their Nobel winning paper.

=== Origins in superconductivity ===
The proposed Higgs mechanism arose as a result of theories proposed to explain observations in superconductivity. A superconductor does not allow penetration by external magnetic fields (the Meissner effect). This strange observation implies that the electromagnetic field somehow becomes short-ranged during this phenomenon. Successful theories arose to explain this during the 1950s, first for fermions (Ginzburg–Landau theory, 1950), and then for bosons (BCS theory, 1957).

In these theories, superconductivity is interpreted as arising from a charged condensate. Initially, the condensate value does not have any preferred direction. This implies that it is scalar, but its phase is capable of defining a gauge in gauge based field theories. To do this, the field must be charged. A charged scalar field must also be complex (or described another way, it contains at least two components, and a symmetry capable of rotating the compontents into each other). In naïve gauge theory, a gauge transformation of a condensate usually rotates the phase. However, in these circumstances, it instead fixes a preferred choice of phase. However it turns out that fixing the choice of gauge so that the condensate has the same phase everywhere, also causes the electromagnetic field to gain an extra term. This extra term causes the electromagnetic field to become short range.

Goldstone's theorem also plays a role in such theories. The connection is technically, when a condensate breaks a symmetry, then the state reached by acting with a symmetry generator on the condensate has the same energy as before. This means that some kinds of oscillation will not involve change of energy. Oscillations with unchanged energy imply that excitations (particles) associated with the oscillation are massless.

Once attention was drawn to this theory within particle physics, the parallels were clear. A change of the usually long range electromagnetic field to become short-ranged, within a gauge invariant theory, was exactly the needed effect sought for the bosons that mediate the weak interaction (because a long-range force has massless gauge bosons, and a short-ranged force implies massive gauge bosons, suggesting that a result of this interaction is that the field's gauge bosons acquired mass, or a similar and equivalent effect). The features of a field required to do this were also quite well-defined – it would have to be a charged scalar field, with at least two components, and complex in order to support a symmetry able to rotate these into each other.

== Examples ==
The Higgs mechanism occurs whenever a charged field has a vacuum expectation value. In the non-relativistic context this is a superconductor, more formally known as the Landau model of a charged Bose–Einstein condensate. In the relativistic condensate, the condensate is a scalar field that is relativistically invariant.

=== Landau model ===
The Higgs mechanism is a type of superconductivity that occurs in the vacuum. It occurs when all of space is filled with a sea of particles which are charged, or, in field language, when a charged field has a nonzero vacuum expectation value. Interaction with the quantum fluid filling the space prevents certain forces from propagating over long distances (as it does inside a superconductor; e.g., in the Ginzburg–Landau theory).

A superconductor expels all magnetic fields from its interior, a phenomenon known as the Meissner effect. This was mysterious for a long time, because it implies that electromagnetic forces somehow become short-range inside the superconductor. Contrast this with the behavior of an ordinary metal. In a metal, the conductivity shields electric fields by rearranging charges on the surface until the total field cancels in the interior.

But magnetic fields can penetrate to any distance, and if a magnetic monopole (an isolated magnetic pole) is surrounded by a metal the field can escape without collimating into a string. In a superconductor, however, electric charges move with no dissipation, and this allows for permanent surface currents, not only surface charges. When magnetic fields are introduced at the boundary of a superconductor, they produce surface currents that exactly neutralize them.

The Meissner effect arises due to currents in a thin surface layer, whose thickness can be calculated from the simple model of Ginzburg–Landau theory, which treats superconductivity as a charged Bose–Einstein condensate.

Suppose that a superconductor contains bosons with charge q. The wavefunction of the bosons can be described by introducing a quantum field, $\ \psi\ ,$ which obeys the Schrödinger equation as a field equation. In units where the reduced Planck constant, ħ, is set to 1:

$$i\ \frac{\partial}{\ \partial t\ }\ \psi ~=~ \frac{\ \left(\nabla - i q A \right)^2 }{2m}\ \psi ~.$$

The operator $\psi(x)$ annihilates a boson at the point x, while its adjoint $\psi^\dagger$ creates a new boson at the same point. The wavefunction of the Bose–Einstein condensate is then the expectation value $\langle\psi\rangle$ of $\psi(x)$, which is a classical function that obeys the same equation. The interpretation of the expectation value is that it is the phase that one should give to a newly created boson so that it will coherently superpose with all the other bosons already in the condensate.

When there is a charged condensate, the electromagnetic interactions are screened. To see this, consider the effect of a gauge transformation on the field. A gauge transformation rotates the phase of the condensate by an amount which changes from point to point, and shifts the vector potential by a gradient:

$$\begin{align}
\psi &\rightarrow e^{iq\phi(x)} \psi \\
A &\rightarrow A + \nabla \phi ~.
\end{align}$$

When there is no condensate, this transformation only changes the definition of the phase of $\ \psi\$ at every point. But when there is a condensate, the phase of the condensate defines a preferred choice of phase.

The condensate wave function can be written as

$$\psi(x) = \rho(x)\ e^{i\theta(x)}\ ,$$

where ρ is real amplitude, which determines the local density of the condensate. If the condensate were neutral, the flow would be along the gradients of θ, the direction in which the phase of the Schrödinger field changes. If the phase θ changes slowly, the flow is slow and has very little energy. But now θ can be made equal to zero just by making a gauge transformation to rotate the phase of the field.

The energy of slow changes of phase can be calculated from the Schrödinger kinetic energy,

$$\ H = \frac{1}{\ 2\ m\ }\ \Bigl| \left( i q A + \nabla \right)\psi\Bigr|^2\ ,$$

and taking the density of the condensate ρ to be constant,

$$H \approx \frac{~ \rho^2\ }{2\ m}\ \left(q A + \nabla \theta \right)^2 ~.$$

Fixing the choice of gauge so that the condensate has the same phase everywhere, the electromagnetic field energy has an extra term,

$$\frac{\; q^2 \rho^2\ }{2\ m} A^2 ~.$$

When this term is present, electromagnetic interactions become short-ranged. Every field mode, no matter how long the wavelength, oscillates with a nonzero frequency. The lowest frequency can be read off from the energy of a long wavelength A mode,

$$E \approx \frac{\; {\dot A}^2}{2} + \frac{\ q^2 \rho^2\ }{2\ m}\ A^2 ~.$$

This is a harmonic oscillator with frequency

$$\sqrt{\frac{1}{\ m\ }\ q^2\ \rho^2\ } ~.$$

The quantity $\ \left|\psi(x)\right|^2 = \rho^2\$ is the density of the condensate of superconducting particles.

In an actual superconductor, the charged particles are electrons, which are fermions not bosons. So in order to have superconductivity, the electrons need to somehow bind into Cooper pairs. The charge of the condensate q is therefore twice the electron charge −e. The pairing in a normal superconductor is due to lattice vibrations, and is in fact very weak; this means that the pairs are very loosely bound. The description of a Bose–Einstein condensate of loosely bound pairs is actually more difficult than the description of a condensate of elementary particles, and was only worked out in 1957 by John Bardeen, Leon Cooper, and John Robert Schrieffer in the famous BCS theory.

=== Abelian Higgs mechanism ===
Gauge invariance means that certain transformations of the gauge field do not change the energy at all. If an arbitrary gradient is added to A, the energy of the field is exactly the same. This makes it difficult to add a mass term, because a mass term tends to push the field toward the value zero. But the zero value of the vector potential is not a gauge invariant idea. What is zero in one gauge is nonzero in another.

So in order to give mass to a gauge theory, the gauge invariance must be broken by a condensate. The condensate will then define a preferred phase, and the phase of the condensate will define the zero value of the field in a gauge-invariant way. The gauge-invariant definition is that a gauge field is zero when the phase change along any path from parallel transport is equal to the phase difference in the condensate wavefunction.

The condensate value is described by a quantum field with an expectation value, just as in the Ginzburg–Landau model.

In order for the phase of the vacuum to define a gauge, the field must have a phase (also referred to as 'to be charged'). In order for a scalar field Φ to have a phase, it must be complex, or (equivalently) it should contain two fields with a symmetry which rotates them into each other. The vector potential changes the phase of the quanta produced by the field when they move from point to point. In terms of fields, it defines how much to rotate the real and imaginary parts of the fields into each other when comparing field values at nearby points.

The only renormalizable model where a complex scalar field Φ acquires a nonzero value is the 'Mexican-hat' model, where the field energy has a minimum away from zero. The action for this model is

$$\ S(\phi) = \int d^4x \left[ \tfrac{1}{2} \left| \partial \phi\right|^2 - \lambda \left( \left|\phi \right|^2 - \Phi^2 \right)^2 \right]\ ,$$

which results in the Hamiltonian

$$\ H(\phi) = \tfrac{1}{2} \left(\left|\dot\phi\right|^2 + \left|\nabla \phi\right|^2\right) + V\left(\left|\phi\right|\right) ~.$$

The first term is the kinetic energy of the field. The second term is the potential energy when the field varies from point to point. The third term is the Higgs potential energy for a given non-zero magnitude, or vacuum expectation value, of the field.

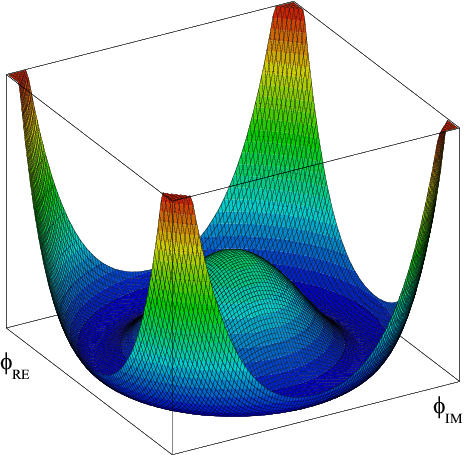
Higgs potential V. For a fixed value of λ, the potential is presented upwards against the real and imaginary parts of Φ . The Mexican-hat or champagne-bottle profile at the ground should be noted.

This potential energy, the Higgs potential, $~ V\left(\phi, \Phi\right) = \lambda \left( \left| \phi \right|^2 - \Phi^2 \right)^2\ ,$ has a graph which looks like a Mexican hat, which gives the model its name. In particular, the minimum energy value is not at $\phi =0$ but on the circle of points where the magnitude of $\phi$ is Φ .

When the field Φ(x) is not coupled to electromagnetism, the Mexican-hat potential has flat directions. Starting in any one of the circle of vacua and changing the phase of the field from point to point costs very little energy. Mathematically, if

$$\ \phi(x) = \Phi e^{i\theta(x)}\$$

with a constant prefactor, then the action for the field θ(x) , i.e., the "phase" of the Higgs field Φ(x) , has only derivative terms. This is not a surprise: Adding a constant to θ(x) is a symmetry of the original theory, so different values of θ(x) cannot have different energies. This is an example of configuring the model to conform to Goldstone's theorem: Spontaneously broken continuous symmetries (normally) produce massless excitations.

The Abelian Higgs model is the Mexican-hat model coupled to electromagnetism:

$$\ S(\phi, A_{\mu}) = \int d^4x \left[ - \tfrac{1}{4} F^{\mu\nu} F_{\mu\nu} + \left|\left(\partial_{\mu} - i q A_{\mu}\right)\phi\right|^2 - \lambda \left( \left| \phi \right|^2 - \Phi^2 \right)^2 \right] ~.$$

Alternate form of the Abelian Higgs model action

The Abelian Higgs model action can also be written

$$\ S[\phi, A] = \int d^4x \left[- \tfrac{1}{4} F^{\mu\nu} F_{\mu\nu} + D_\mu \phi (D^\mu\phi)^* - V(\phi) \right]\ ,$$

where the potential is

$$\ V(\phi) = \lambda \left(\left| \phi\right|^2 - \Phi^2 \right)^2 ~.$$

and the covariant derivative $D_\mu$ is

$$\ D_\mu = \partial_\mu - iqA_\mu ~.$$

For completeness, the tensor $\ F_{\mu\nu} = \partial_\mu A_\nu - \partial_\nu A_\mu\$ is the Maxwell tensor, also known as the electromagnetic field strength, $\ \mathrm{U}(1)\$ field strength or more geometrically the curvature of the $\ \mathrm{U}(1)\$ connection $A_\mu$. The four-vector gauge field $\ A_\mu\$ is also known as the four-potential.

This makes the gauge-invariance of the action (and therefore Lagrangian and resulting equations of motion) manifest. The potential makes the non-zero vacuum expectation value evident.

The classical vacuum is again at the minimum of the potential, where the magnitude of the complex field $\phi$ is equal to Φ . But now the phase of the field is arbitrary, because gauge transformations change it. This means that the field $\ \theta(x)\$ can be set to zero by a gauge transformation, and does not represent any actual degrees of freedom at all.

Furthermore, choosing a gauge where the phase of the vacuum is fixed, the potential energy for fluctuations of the vector field is nonzero. So in the Abelian Higgs model, the gauge field acquires a mass. To calculate the magnitude of the mass, consider a constant value of the vector potential A in the x-direction in the gauge where the condensate has constant phase. This is the same as a sinusoidally varying condensate in the gauge where the vector potential is zero. In the gauge where A is zero, the potential energy density in the condensate is the scalar gradient energy:

$$\ E = \tfrac{1}{2} \left|\partial \left(\Phi e^{i q A x} \right) \right|^2 = \tfrac{1}{2} q^2 \Phi^2 A^2 ~.$$

This energy is the same as a mass term 1/2m^{2}A^{2} where m = q Φ .

==== Mathematical details of the abelian Higgs mechanism ====
Lagrangian in explicit symmetry broken form

Start from the Lagrangian

$$\ \mathcal{L} = - \tfrac{1}{4} F^{\mu\nu} F_{\mu\nu} + \tfrac{1}{2} D_\mu \phi (D^\mu\phi)^* - V(\phi)\ ,$$

with

$$\ D_\mu \phi = \partial_\mu\phi + ieA_\mu\phi\$$
$$\ V(\phi) = \tfrac{1}{4}\lambda (|\phi|^2 - v^2)^2 ~.$$

Guided by the minimum of the potential $V$ being at $\ |\phi| = v\ ,$ we write the complex scalar field $\ \phi(x)\$ in terms of real scalar fields $\ \xi(x)\$ and $\ \eta(x)\$ as follows:

$$\ \phi(x) = e^{i\xi(x)}(\eta(x) + v) ~.$$

The field $\ \xi(x)\$ is known as the Nambu-Goldstone field, and the field $\ \eta(x)\$ is known as the Higgs boson.

Upon rewriting the Lagrangian in terms of $\ \xi\$ and $\ \eta\$ one finds

$$\ \mathcal{L} = - \tfrac{1}{4} F^{\mu\nu} F_{\mu\nu} + \tfrac{1}{2} \left[ \partial_\mu \eta \partial^\mu\eta + \left( \eta + v \right)^2\ \left(\partial_\mu\xi + eA_\mu\right)^2\right] - \left[ \lambda v^2 \eta^2 + \lambda v \eta^3 + \tfrac{1}{4}\lambda \eta^4 \right] ~.$$

At this point the only term which contains $\ \xi\$ is the term containing $\ \partial_\mu\xi + eA_\mu ~.$ But the dependence on $\ \xi\$ can be gauged away by the gauge transformation which sends $\ A_\mu + \frac{1}{\ e\ }\partial_\mu\xi \mapsto A_\mu ~.$ This is known as the unitary or unitarity gauge. In differential-geometric language, as is spelled out in the following box, the condensate $\xi(x)$ has defined a canonical trivialization.

In unitary gauge, the Lagrangian can be organised into parts which depend on the gauge field and Higgs field

$$\ \mathcal{L} = -\tfrac{1}{4} F_{\mu\nu}F^{\mu\nu} + \tfrac{1}{2} e^2\left( \eta + v \right)^2 A_\mu A^\mu + \tfrac{1}{2} \partial_\mu \eta \partial^\mu\eta - \lambda v^2\eta^2 - \lambda v\eta^3 - \tfrac{1}{4}\lambda \eta^4\$$

or into quadratic and interaction pieces

$$\ \mathcal{L} = \left[ - \tfrac{1}{4} F_{\mu\nu}F^{\mu\nu} + \tfrac{1}{2} e^2 v^2 A_\mu A^\mu + \tfrac{1}{2}\partial_\mu \eta \partial^\mu\eta - \lambda v^2 \eta^2 \right] + \left[ -\lambda v\eta^3 - \tfrac{1}{4}\lambda \eta^4 + \tfrac{1}{2} \left( \eta^2 + 2v\eta \right) A^\mu A_\mu \right] ~.$$

By focusing on the quadratic piece, we see that the gauge field $\ A_\mu\$ has acquired a Proca mass, while the Higgs field $\ \eta\$ has a mass of $\ \sqrt{2 \lambda v^2 ~} ~.$

This method largely carries over to the case where the $\ \mathrm{U}(1)\$ gauge symmetry is promoted to a non-abelian gauge group $\ G ~.$ The Nambu-Goldstone field $\ \xi\$ is then promoted to a $\ \mathfrak{g}$-valued field, where $\ \mathfrak{g}\$ is the Lie algebra of $G ~.$

Spontaneous symmetry breaking and trivializations

A more mathematical or specifically differential-geometric viewpoint is that the field $\ \theta(x)\$ picks out a canonical trivialization which breaks the right-invariance of the principal bundle that the gauge theory lives on.

This is realized most easily when the theory is based on flat spacetime $\ \mathbb{R}^{1,3}\ ,$ as then the base spacetime is contractible, and hence any fibre bundle is trivial. In gauge theory one considers principal bundles with the spacetime as its base manifold, where the fibre is a torsor of the gauge group $\ G ~.$ Crucially, since the principal bundle must be trivial, there exists a global trivialization. In physics, one generally works under an implicit global trivialization and rarely in the more abstract principal bundle.

However, there are many choices of global trivialization, which differ from one another by a transition function, which can be written as a function

$$\ g: \mathbb{R}^{1,3}\rightarrow G ~.$$

From the physical viewpoint, this is known as a gauge transformation. There is a corresponding (choice of) transition function or gauge transformation at the algebra level

$$\ \alpha: \mathbb{R}^{1,3}\rightarrow \mathfrak{g}\$$

such that $\ \exp(\alpha(x)) = g(x)\ ,$ where $~ \exp ~$ is the exponential map for Lie algebras. Then we can view the phase function $\theta(x)$ as a transition function at the algebra level. It picks out a canonical global trivialization which 'differs from' the initial implicit global trivialization by $\ \theta(x) ~.$

This breaks the (right-)invariance of the principal bundle under the action of $\ G\ ,$ as this action does not preserve the canonical trivialization. Mathematically, this is the symmetry which is broken during spontaneous symmetry breaking. For the Abelian Higgs mechanism the relevant gauge group is $\ \mathrm{U}(1) ~.$

=== Non-Abelian Higgs mechanism ===
The non-abelian Higgs model has the following action

$$S(\phi,\mathbf A) = \int {1 \over 4g^2} \mathop{\textrm{tr}}(F^{\mu\nu}F_{\mu \nu}) + |D\phi|^2 + V(|\phi|) ,$$

where now the non-Abelian field A is contained in the covariant derivative D and in the tensor components $F^{\mu \nu}$ and $F_{\mu \nu}$ (the relation between A and those components is well-known from the Yang–Mills theory).

It is exactly analogous to the Abelian Higgs model. Now the field $\phi$ is in a representation of the gauge group, and the gauge covariant derivative is defined by the rate of change of the field minus the rate of change from parallel transport using the gauge field A as a connection.

$$D\phi = \partial \phi - i A^k t_k \phi$$

Again, the expectation value of $\phi$ defines a preferred gauge where the vacuum is constant, and fixing this gauge, fluctuations in the gauge field A come with a nonzero energy cost.

Depending on the representation of the scalar field, not every gauge field acquires a mass. A simple example is in the renormalizable version of an early electroweak model due to Julian Schwinger. In this model, the gauge group is SO(3) (or SU(2) − there are no spinor representations in the model), and the gauge invariance is broken down to U(1) or SO(2) at long distances. To make a consistent renormalizable version using the Higgs mechanism, introduce a scalar field $\phi^a$ which transforms as a vector (a triplet) of SO(3). If this field has a vacuum expectation value, it points in some direction in field space. Without loss of generality, one can choose the z-axis in field space to be the direction that $\phi$ is pointing, and then the vacuum expectation value of $\phi$ is (0, 0, Ã), where Ã is a constant with dimensions of mass ($c = \hbar = 1$).

Rotations around the z-axis form a U(1) subgroup of SO(3) which preserves the vacuum expectation value of $\phi$, and this is the unbroken gauge group. Rotations around the x and y-axis do not preserve the vacuum, and the components of the SO(3) gauge field which generate these rotations become massive vector mesons. There are two massive W mesons in the Schwinger model, with a mass set by the mass scale Ã, and one massless U(1) gauge boson, similar to the photon.

The Schwinger model predicts magnetic monopoles at the electroweak unification scale, and does not predict the Z boson. It doesn't break electroweak symmetry properly as in nature. But historically, a model similar to this (but not using the Higgs mechanism) was the first in which the weak force and the electromagnetic force were unified.

=== Affine Higgs mechanism ===
Ernst Stueckelberg discovered a version of the Higgs mechanism by analyzing the theory of quantum electrodynamics with a massive photon. Effectively, Stueckelberg's model is a limit of the regular Mexican hat Abelian Higgs model, where the vacuum expectation value H goes to infinity and the charge of the Higgs field goes to zero in such a way that their product stays fixed. The mass of the Higgs boson is proportional to H, so the Higgs boson becomes infinitely massive and decouples, so is not present in the discussion. The vector meson mass, however, is equal to the product eH, and stays finite.

The interpretation is that when a U(1) gauge field does not require quantized charges, it is possible to keep only the angular part of the Higgs oscillations, and discard the radial part. The angular part of the Higgs field θ has the following gauge transformation law:

$$\begin{align}
\theta &\rightarrow \theta + e\alpha\,\\
A &\rightarrow A + \partial \alpha ~.
\end{align}$$

The gauge covariant derivative for the angle (which is actually gauge invariant) is:

$$D\theta = \partial \theta - e A H ~.$$

In order to keep θ fluctuations finite and nonzero in this limit, θ should be rescaled by H, so that its kinetic term in the action stays normalized. The action for the theta field is read off from the Mexican hat action by substituting $\phi = H e^{i\theta/H}$.

$$S = \int \bigl[ \tfrac{1}{4}F^2 + \tfrac{1}{2}(D\theta)^2\bigr] = \int\bigl[ \tfrac{1}{4}F^2 + \tfrac{1}{2}(\partial \theta - He A)^2\bigr] = \int\bigl[ \tfrac{1}{4}F^2 + \tfrac{1}{2}(\partial \theta - m A)^2\bigr]$$

since eH is the gauge boson mass. By making a gauge transformation to set θ = 0, the gauge freedom in the action is eliminated, and the action becomes that of a massive vector field:

$$S= \tfrac{1}{2}\int \bigl[ \tfrac{1}{2} F^2 +  m^2 A^2 \bigr]\, .$$

To have arbitrarily small charges requires that the U(1) is not the circle of unit complex numbers under multiplication, but the real numbers under addition, which is only different in the global topology. Such a U(1) group is non-compact. The field θ transforms as an affine representation of the gauge group. Among the allowed gauge groups, only non-compact U(1) admits affine representations, and the U(1) of electromagnetism is experimentally known to be compact, since charge quantization holds to extremely high accuracy.

The Higgs condensate in this model has infinitesimal charge, so interactions with the Higgs boson do not violate charge conservation. The theory of quantum electrodynamics with a massive photon is still a renormalizable theory, one in which electric charge is still conserved, but magnetic monopoles are not allowed. For non-Abelian gauge theory, there is no affine limit, and the Higgs oscillations cannot be too much more massive than the vectors.

== See also ==
- Electromagnetic mass
- Higgs bundle
- Quantum triviality
- Weinberg angle
- Yang–Mills–Higgs equations
