= Dedekind psi function =

Arithmetical function

In number theory, the Dedekind psi function is the multiplicative function on the positive integers defined by

$$\psi(n) = n \prod_{p|n}\left(1+\frac{1}{p}\right),$$

where the product is taken over all primes $p$ dividing $n.$ (By convention, $\psi(1)$, which is the empty product, has value 1.) The function was introduced by Richard Dedekind in connection with modular functions.

The value of $\psi(n)$ for the first few positive integers $n$ is:

1, 3, 4, 6, 6, 12, 8, 12, 12, 18, 12, 24, ... (sequence A001615 in the OEIS).

The function $\psi(n)$ is greater than $n$ for all $n$ greater than 1, and is even for all $n$ greater than 2. If $n$ is a square-free number then $\psi(n) = \sigma(n)$, where $\sigma(n)$ is the sum-of-divisors function.

The $\psi$ function can also be defined by setting $\psi(p^n) = (p+1)p^{n-1}$ for powers of any prime $p$, and then extending the definition to all integers by multiplicativity. This also leads to a proof of the generating function in terms of the Riemann zeta function, which is

$$\sum \frac{\psi(n)}{n^s} = \frac{\zeta(s) \zeta(s-1)}{\zeta(2s)}.$$

This is also a consequence of the fact that we can write the function as a Dirichlet convolution of $\psi= \mathrm{Id} * |\mu|$.

There is an additive definition of the psi function as well. Quoting from Dickson,

R. Dedekind proved that, if $n$ is decomposed in every way into a product $ab$ and if $e$ is the g.c.d. of $a, b$ then

$$\sum_{a}  (a/e) \varphi(e) = n \prod_{p|n}\left(1+\frac{1}{p}\right)$$

where $a$ ranges over all divisors of $n$ and $p$ over the prime divisors of $n$ and $\varphi$ is the totient function.

== Higher orders ==
The generalization to higher orders via ratios of Jordan's totient is

$$\psi_k(n)=\frac{J_{2k}(n)}{J_k(n)}$$

with Dirichlet series

$$\sum_{n\ge 1}\frac{\psi_k(n)}{n^s} = \frac{\zeta(s)\zeta(s-k)}{\zeta(2s)}$$.

It is also the Dirichlet convolution of a power and the square of the Möbius function,

$$\psi_k(n) = n^k * \mu^2(n)$$.

If

$$\epsilon_2 = 1,0,0,1,0,0,0,0,1,0,0,0,0,0,0,1,0,0,0\ldots$$

is the characteristic function of the squares, another Dirichlet convolution leads to the generalized σ-function,

$$\epsilon_2(n) * \psi_k(n) = \sigma_k(n)$$.

== See also ==
- Goro Shimura (1971). Introduction to the Arithmetic Theory of Automorphic Functions. Princeton. (page 25, equation (1))
- Mathar, Richard J. (2011). "Survey of Dirichlet series of multiplicative arithmetic functions". arXiv:1106.4038 [math.NT]. Section 3.13.2
- OEIS: A065958 is ψ_{2}, OEIS: A065959 is ψ_{3}, and OEIS: A065960 is ψ_{4}
