= Jacobi ellipsoid =

Shape taken by a self-gravitating fluid body rotating at constant velocity

Artistic rendering of Haumea, a dwarf planet with triaxial ellipsoid shape.

A Jacobi ellipsoid is a triaxial (i.e. scalene) ellipsoid under hydrostatic equilibrium which arises when a self-gravitating, fluid body of uniform density rotates with a constant angular velocity. It is named after the German mathematician Carl Gustav Jacob Jacobi.

== History ==
Before Jacobi, the Maclaurin spheroid, which was formulated in 1742, was considered to be the only type of ellipsoid which can be in equilibrium. Lagrange in 1811 considered the possibility of a tri-axial ellipsoid being in equilibrium, but concluded that the two equatorial axes of the ellipsoid must be equal, leading back to the solution of Maclaurin spheroid. But Jacobi realized that Lagrange's demonstration is a sufficiency condition, but not necessary. He remarked:

"One would make a grave mistake if one supposed that the spheroids of revolution are the only admissible figures of equilibrium even under the restrictive assumption of second-degree surfaces" (...) "In fact a simple consideration shows that ellipsoids with three unequal axes can very well be figures of equilibrium; and that one can assume an ellipse of arbitrary shape for the equatorial section and determine the third axis (which is also the least of the three axes) and the angular velocity of rotation such that the ellipsoid is a figure of equilibrium."

== Jacobi formula ==
The equatorial (a, b) and polar (c) semi-principal axes of a Jacobi ellipsoid and Maclaurin spheroid, as a function of normalized angular momentum, subject to abc = 1 (i.e. for constant volume of 4π/3). The broken lines are for the Maclaurin spheroid in the range where it has dynamic but not secular stability – it will relax into the Jacobi ellipsoid provided it can dissipate energy by virtue of a viscous constituent fluid.

For an ellipsoid with equatorial semi-principal axes $a, \ b$ and polar semi-principal axis $c$, the angular velocity $\Omega$ about $c$ is given by

$$\frac{\Omega^2}{\pi G\rho} = 2 abc \int_0^\infty \frac{u\,du}{(a^2+u)(b^2+u)\Delta}\ , \quad \Delta^2 = (a^2+u)(b^2+u)(c^2+u),$$

where $\rho$ is the density and $G$ is the gravitational constant, subject to the condition

$$a^2 b^2 \int_0^\infty \frac{du}{(a^2+u)(b^2+u)\Delta} = c^2\int_0^\infty \frac{du}{(c^2+u)\Delta}.$$

For fixed values of $a$ and $b$, the above condition has solution for $c$ such that

$$\frac{1}{c^2}>\frac{1}{a^2} + \frac{1}{b^2}.$$

The integrals can be expressed in terms of incomplete elliptic integrals. In terms of the Carlson symmetric form elliptic integral $R_{J}$, the formula for the angular velocity becomes

$$\frac{\Omega^2}{\pi G \rho} = \frac{4 a b c}{3 (a^2 - b^2)} [a^2 R_J(a^2,b^2,c^2,a^2) - b^{2} R_J(a^2,b^2,c^2,b^2)]$$

and the condition on the relative size of the semi-principal axes $a, \ b, \ c$ is

$$\frac{a^2 b^2}{b^2 - a^2} [R_J(a^2,b^2,c^2,a^2) - R_J(a^2,b^2,c^2,b^2)] =  c^2 R_J(a^2,b^2,c^2,c^2).$$

The angular momentum $L$ of the Jacobi ellipsoid is given by

$$\frac{L}{\sqrt{GM^3 r}} = \frac{\sqrt 3}{10}\frac{a^2+b^2}{r^2}\sqrt{\frac{\Omega^2}{\pi G\rho}} \ , \quad r=\sqrt[3]{abc},$$

where $M$ is the mass of the ellipsoid and $r$ is the mean radius, the radius of a sphere of the same volume as the ellipsoid.

== Relationship with Dedekind ellipsoid ==
The Jacobi and Dedekind ellipsoids are both equilibrium figures for a body of rotating homogeneous self-gravitating fluid. However, while the Jacobi ellipsoid spins bodily, with no internal flow of the fluid in the rotating frame, the Dedekind ellipsoid maintains a fixed orientation, with the constituent fluid circulating within it. This is a direct consequence of Dedekind's theorem.

For any given Jacobi ellipsoid, there exists a Dedekind ellipsoid with the same semi-principal axes $a, \ b, \ c$ and same mass and with a flow velocity field of

$$\mathbf{u} = \zeta \frac{- a^2 y \mathbf{\hat{x}} + b^2 x \mathbf{\hat{y}}}{a^2 + b^2},$$

where $x, \ y, \ z$ are Cartesian coordinates on axes $\hat{x}, \ \hat{y}, \ \hat{z}$ aligned respectively with the $a, \ b, \ c$ axes of the ellipsoid. Here $\zeta$ is the vorticity, which is uniform throughout the spheroid ($\nabla\times \mathbf{u} = \zeta \mathbf{\hat{z}}$). The angular velocity $\Omega$ of the Jacobi ellipsoid and vorticity of the corresponding Dedekind ellipsoid are related by

$$\zeta = \left( \frac{a}{b} + \frac{b}{a}\right) \Omega.$$

That is, each particle of the fluid of the Dedekind ellipsoid describes a similar elliptical circuit in the same period in which the Jacobi spheroid performs one rotation.

In the special case of $a = b$, the Jacobi and Dedekind ellipsoids (and the Maclaurin spheroid) become one and the same; bodily rotation and circular flow amount to the same thing. In this case $\zeta = 2 \Omega$, as is always true for a rigidly rotating body.

In the general case, the Jacobi and Dedekind ellipsoids have the same energy, but the angular momentum of the Jacobi spheroid is the greater by a factor of

$$\frac{L_{\mathrm{Jac}}}{L_{\mathrm{Ded}}} = \frac{1}{2} \left( \frac{a}{b} + \frac{b}{a}\right).$$

== See also ==
- Maclaurin spheroid
- Dirichlet's ellipsoidal problem
- Spheroid
- Ellipsoid
