= Maclaurin spheroid =

Shape of a spinning body of self-gravitating fluid

A Maclaurin spheroid is an oblate spheroid which arises when a self-gravitating fluid body of uniform density rotates with a constant angular velocity. This spheroid is named after the Scottish mathematician Colin Maclaurin, who formulated it for the shape of Earth in 1742. In fact the figure of the Earth is far less oblate than Maclaurin's formula suggests, since the Earth is not homogeneous, but has a dense iron core. The Maclaurin spheroid is considered to be the simplest model of rotating ellipsoidal figures in hydrostatic equilibrium since it assumes uniform density.

== Maclaurin formula ==
Angular velocity for Maclaurin spheroid as a function of eccentricity

For a spheroid with equatorial semi-major axis $a$ and polar semi-minor axis $c$, the angular velocity $\Omega$ about $c$ is given by Maclaurin's formula

$$\frac{\Omega^2}{\pi G\rho} = \frac{2\sqrt{1-e^2}}{e^3}(3-2e^2) \sin^{-1}e - \frac{6}{e^2}(1-e^2), \quad e^2 = 1-\frac{c^2}{a^2},$$

where $e$ is the eccentricity of meridional cross-sections of the spheroid, $\rho$ is the density and $G$ is the gravitational constant. The formula predicts two possible equilibrium figures, one which approaches a sphere ($e\rightarrow 0$) when $\Omega\rightarrow 0$ and the other which approaches a very flattened spheroid ($e\rightarrow 1$) when $\Omega\rightarrow 0$. The maximum angular velocity occurs at eccentricity $e=0.92996$ and its value is $\Omega^2/(\pi G\rho)=0.449331$, so that above this speed, no equilibrium figures exist. The angular momentum $L$ is

$$\frac{L}{\sqrt{GM^3\bar{a}}} = \frac{\sqrt 3}{5} \left(\frac{a}{\bar{a}}\right)^2 \sqrt{\frac{\Omega^2}{\pi G\rho}} \ , \quad \bar{a} = (a^2c)^{1/3}$$

where $M$ is the mass of the spheroid and $\bar{a}$ is the mean radius, the radius of a sphere of the same volume as the spheroid.

== Stability ==
For a Maclaurin spheroid of eccentricity greater than 0.812670, a Jacobi ellipsoid of the same angular momentum has lower total energy. If such a spheroid is composed of a viscous fluid (or in the presence of gravitational radiation reaction), and if it suffers a perturbation which breaks its rotational symmetry, then it will gradually elongate into the Jacobi ellipsoidal form, while dissipating its excess energy as heat (or gravitational waves). This is termed secular instability; see Roberts–Stewartson instability and Chandrasekhar–Friedman–Schutz instability. However, for a similar spheroid composed of an inviscid fluid (or in the absence of radiation reaction), the perturbation will merely result in an undamped oscillation. This is described as dynamic (or ordinary) stability.

A Maclaurin spheroid of eccentricity greater than 0.952887 is dynamically unstable. Even if it is composed of an inviscid fluid and has no means of losing energy, a suitable perturbation will grow (at least initially) exponentially. Dynamic instability implies secular instability (and secular stability implies dynamic stability).

== See also ==
- Jacobi ellipsoid
- Spheroid
- Ellipsoid
