= Dimensionless physical constant =

Physical constant with no units

In physics, a dimensionless physical constant is a physical constant that is dimensionless, i.e. a pure number having no units attached and having a numerical value that is independent of whatever system of units may be used. These dimensionless constants appear in many physics and engineering models. In fundamental physical models, sets of dimensionless physical constants characterize specific models.

== Fundamental constants ==
Physicists have discussed the nature of the term fundamental physical constant, those physical constants that appear in the most fundamental physics equations. Michael Duff argues that the laws of physics should not depend on the units of measurement: only dimensionless physical constants should be used in these laws. By using the system of natural units where dimensioned physical constants are all set to 1, the laws of physics will contain only dimensionless physical constants. Lev Okun argues that while the laws of physics are based solely on dimensionless constants, measurements require units and the minimum set of dimensioned constants includes the speed of light, the Planck constant, and the gravitational constant.

A set of fundamental dimensionless constants determine a given physical theory. Such constants cannot be explained by the theory and must be measured experimentally and verified to be constant in experiments. However such constants may be explained by a new theory with a different set of constants. Developments in physics may lead to either a reduction or an extension of their number: discovery of new particles, or new relationships between physical phenomena, would introduce new constants, while the development of a more fundamental theory might allow the derivation of several constants from a more fundamental constant.

However, the term fundamental physical constant is also used to refer to certain universal dimensioned physical constants, such as the speed of light c, vacuum permittivity ε_{0}, Planck constant h, and the Newtonian constant of gravitation G, that appear in the most basic theories of physics. NIST and CODATA use the term in this manner.

=== Examples ===
Dimensionless fundamental physical constants include:

- α, the fine-structure constant, (≈ 1/137). This is also the square of the electron charge, expressed in Planck units, which defines the scale of charge of elementary particles with charge. The electron charge is the coupling constant for the electromagnetic interaction.
- μ or β, the proton-to-electron mass ratio (≈ 1836), the rest mass of the proton divided by that of the electron. More generally, the ratio of the rest masses of any pair of elementary particles.
- α_{s}, the coupling constant for the strong force (≈ 1)

==== Fine-structure constant ====
One of the dimensionless fundamental constants is the fine-structure constant:

$\alpha = \frac{e^2}{4 \pi \varepsilon_0 \ \hbar c}= \frac{e^2}{2 \varepsilon_0 h c} =$ 0.0072973525643(11),

where e is the elementary charge, ħ is the reduced Planck constant, c is the speed of light in vacuum, and ε_{0} is the permittivity of free space. The fine-structure constant is fixed to the strength of the electromagnetic force. At low energies, α ≈ 1/137, whereas at the scale of the Z boson, about 90 GeV, one measures α ≈ 1/127. There is no accepted theory explaining the value of α.

==== Standard Model ====
The original Standard Model of particle physics from the 1970s contained 19 fundamental dimensionless constants describing the masses of the particles and the strengths of the electroweak and strong forces. In the 1990s, neutrinos were discovered to have nonzero mass, and a quantity called the vacuum angle was found to be indistinguishable from zero.

The complete Standard Model requires 25 fundamental dimensionless constants. At present, their numerical values are not understood in terms of any widely accepted theory and are determined only from measurement. These 25 constants are:

- the fine structure constant;
- the strong coupling constant;
- fifteen masses of the fundamental particles (relative to the Planck mass m_{P} = 1.22089(6)×10^{19} GeV/c^{2}), namely:
  - six quarks
  - six leptons
  - the Higgs boson
  - the W boson
  - the Z boson
- four parameters of the Cabibbo–Kobayashi–Maskawa matrix, describing how quarks oscillate between different forms;
- four parameters of the Pontecorvo–Maki–Nakagawa–Sakata matrix, which does the same thing for neutrinos.

Dimensionless constants of the Standard Model
Symbol	Description	Dimensionless value	Alternative value representation
m_{u} / m_{P}	up quark mass	1.4×10^{−22} – 2.7×10^{−22}	1.7–3.3 MeV/c^{2}
m_{d} / m_{P}	down quark mass	3.4×10^{−22} – 4.8×10^{−22}	4.1–5.8 MeV/c^{2}
m_{c} / m_{P}	charm quark mass	1.04431+0.0204768 −0.0286675×10^{−19}	1.275+0.025 −0.035 GeV/c^{2}
m_{s} / m_{P}	strange quark mass	8.27×10^{−21}	95+9 −3 MeV/c^{2}
m_{t} / m_{P}	top quark mass	(1.415±0.00245721)×10^{−17}	172.76±0.3 GeV/c^{2}
m_{b} / m_{P}	bottom quark mass	3.43×10^{−19}	4.19 GeV/c^{2}
θ_{12,CKM}	CKM 12-mixing angle	0.22759±0.000873	13.04°±0.05°
θ_{23,CKM}	CKM 23-mixing angle	0.04154±0.00105	2.38°±0.06°
θ_{13,CKM}	CKM 13-mixing angle	0.003508±0.000192	0.201°±0.011°
δ_{13,CKM}	CKM CP-violating phase	1.201±0.0785	68.8°±4.5°
m_{e} / m_{P}	electron mass	4.18546×10^{−23}	0.511 MeV/c^{2}
m_{ν_{e}} / m_{P}	electron neutrino mass	below 9×10^{−30}	below 0.11 eV/c^{2}
m_{μ} / m_{P}	muon mass	8.65418×10^{−21}	105.7 MeV/c^{2}
m_{ν_{μ}} / m_{P}	muon neutrino mass	below 1.6×10^{−28}	below 2 eV/c^{2}
m_{τ} / m_{P}	tau mass	1.45535×10^{−19}	1.78 GeV/c^{2}
m_{ν_{τ}} / m_{P}	tau neutrino mass	below 1.6×10^{−28}	below 2 eV/c^{2}
θ_{12,PMNS}	PMNS 12-mixing angle	0.58364±0.0122	33.44°+0.77° −0.74°
θ_{23,PMNS}	PMNS 23-mixing angle	0.8587+0.0175 −0.0227	49.2°+1.0° −1.3°
θ_{13,PMNS}	PMNS 13-mixing angle	0.1496+0.00227 −0.00209	8.57°+0.13° −0.12°
δ_{Cp,PMNS}	PMNS CP-violating phase	2.95 ≤ δ ≤ 4.294	169° ≤ δ ≤ 246°
α	fine-structure constant	0.00729735	1 / 137.036
α_{s}	strong coupling constant	≈ 1	≈ 1
m_{W^{±}} / m_{P}	W boson mass	(6.5841±0.0012)×10^{−18}	80.385±0.015 GeV/c^{2}
m_{Z^{0}} / m_{P}	Z boson mass	(7.46888±0.00016)×10^{−18}	91.1876±0.002 GeV/c^{2}
m_{H} / m_{P}	Higgs boson mass	≈ 1.02×10^{−17}	125.09±0.24 GeV/c^{2}

==== Gravitational coupling constant ====
A gravitational coupling constant is a constant characterizing the gravitational attraction between a given pair of elementary particles. The electron mass is typically used, and the associated constant typically denoted α_{G}. It is a dimensionless quantity, with the result that its numerical value does not vary with the choice of units of measurement, only with the choice of particle.

The gravitational coupling constant, α_{G}, can be defined in terms of the gravitational attraction between two elementary particles:

$$\alpha_\mathrm{G} = \frac{G m_\mathrm{p}^2}{\hbar c}$$

where:

- G is the gravitational constant;
- m_{p} is the particle rest mass;
- c is the speed of light in vacuum;
- ħ is the reduced Planck constant.

For a proton the value of the dimensionless constant is approximately 5×10^{−39}.

In natural units where c = ħ = 1, the expression becomes
$$\alpha_\mathrm{G} = Gm_\mathrm{p}^2 \ .$$

In 1961, a dimensionless gravitational coupling constant was used by Robert H. Dicke. Dicke's work has been described as perhaps the first explicit discussion of the weak anthropic principle. This principle has various forms. The basic idea is that the constants in physical laws are limited to values which can give rise to physicists. Dicke reasoned that the gravitational coupling must be an extremely small number to ensure that expansion of the universe could continue against the force of gravity caused by all the matter in the universe. Dicke's analysis countered an earlier hypothesis by Paul Dirac, suggesting that the gravitational coupling constant depends on cosmic density. In a Big Bang model of the universe, the density varies strongly with time. Dicke noted that sufficient time must elapse for stars to form and this requires a very small gravitational coupling constant.

==== Cosmological constants ====
The cosmological constant, which can be thought of as the density of dark energy in the universe, is a fundamental constant in physical cosmology that has a dimensionless value of approximately 10^{−122}. Other dimensionless constants are the measure of homogeneity in the universe, denoted by Q, which is explained below by Martin Rees, the baryon mass per photon, the cold dark matter mass per photon and the neutrino mass per photon.

==== Barrow and Tipler ====
Barrow and Tipler (1986) anchor their broad-ranging discussion of astrophysics, cosmology, quantum physics, teleology, and the anthropic principle in the fine-structure constant, the proton-to-electron mass ratio (which they, along with Barrow (2002), call β), and the coupling constants for the strong force and gravitation.

==== Martin Rees's 'six numbers' ====
Martin Rees, in his book Just Six Numbers, mulls over the following six dimensionless constants, whose values he deems fundamental to present-day physical theory and the known structure of the universe:

- N ≈ 10^{36}: the ratio of the electrostatic and the gravitational forces between two protons. This ratio is denoted α/α_{G} in Barrow and Tipler (1986). N governs the relative importance of gravity and electrostatic attraction/repulsion in explaining the properties of baryonic matter;
- ε ≈ 0.007: The fraction of the mass of four protons that is released as energy when fused into a helium nucleus. ε governs the energy output of stars, and is determined by the coupling constant for the strong force;
- Ω ≈ 0.3: the ratio of the actual density of the universe to the critical (minimum) density required for the universe to eventually collapse under its gravity. Ω determines the ultimate fate of the universe. If Ω ≥ 1, the universe may experience a Big Crunch. If Ω < 1, the universe may expand forever.
- λ ≈ 0.7: The ratio of the energy density of the universe, due to the cosmological constant, to the critical density of the universe. Others denote this ratio by $\Omega_{\Lambda}$;
- Q ≈ 10^{−5}: The energy required to break up and disperse an instance of the largest known structures in the universe, namely a galactic cluster or supercluster, expressed as a fraction of the energy equivalent to the rest mass m of that structure, namely mc^{2};
- D = 3: the number of macroscopic spatial dimensions.

Any plausible fundamental physical theory must be consistent with these six constants, and must either derive their values from the mathematics of the theory, or accept their values as empirical.

== History ==
In the 1920s and 1930s, Arthur Eddington embarked upon extensive mathematical investigation into the relations between the fundamental quantities in basic physical theories, later used as part of his effort to construct an overarching theory unifying quantum mechanics and cosmological physics. For example, he speculated on the potential consequences of the ratio of the electron radius to its mass. Most notably, in a 1929 paper he set out an argument based on the Pauli exclusion principle and the Dirac equation that fixed the value of the reciprocal of the fine-structure constant as 𝛼^{−1} = 16 + 1/2 × 16 × (16–1) = 136. When its value was discovered to be closer to 137, he changed his argument to match that value. His ideas were not widely accepted, and subsequent experiments have shown that they were wrong (for example, none of the measurements of the fine-structure constant suggest an integer value; the modern CODATA value is α^{−1} = 137.035999177(21).

Eddington may have been the first to attempt in vain to derive the basic dimensionless constants from fundamental theories and equations, but he was certainly not the last. Many others would subsequently undertake similar endeavors, and efforts occasionally continue even today. None have yet produced convincing results or gained wide acceptance among theoretical physicists.

An empirical relation between the masses of the electron, muon and tau has been discovered by physicist Yoshio Koide, but this formula remains unexplained.

== See also ==
- Cabibbo–Kobayashi–Maskawa matrix (Cabibbo angle)
- Dimensionless numbers in fluid mechanics
- Dirac large numbers hypothesis
- Neutrino oscillation
- Physical cosmology
- Standard Model
- Weinberg angle
- Fine-tuned universe
- Koide formula

== External articles ==
General

- John Barrow (2002), The Constants of Nature; From Alpha to Omega – The Numbers that Encode the Deepest Secrets of the Universe, Pantheon Books, ISBN 0-375-42221-8
- Barrow, John D.; Tipler, Frank J. (1986). The Anthropic Cosmological Principle (1st ed.). Oxford University Press. ISBN 978-0-19-282147-8. LCCN 87028148.
- Michio Kaku (1994), Hyperspace: A Scientific Odyssey Through Parallel Universes, Time Warps, and the Tenth Dimension, Oxford University Press, Bibcode:1994hsot.book.....K
- Fundamental Physical Constants from NIST
- Values of fundamental constants. CODATA, 2002.
- Simon Plouffe, 2004, "A search for a mathematical expression for mass ratios using a large database. "

Articles on variance of the fundamental constants

- Bahcall, John N.; Steinhardt, Charles L.; Schlegel, David (10 January 2004). "Does the Fine-Structure Constant Vary with Cosmological Epoch?". The Astrophysical Journal. 600 (2): 520–543. arXiv:astro-ph/0301507. Bibcode:2004ApJ...600..520B. doi:10.1086/379971. ISSN 0004-637X. S2CID 8875571.
- John D. Barrow and Webb, J. K., "Inconstant Constants – Do the inner workings of nature change with time?" Scientific American (June 2005).
- Michael Duff, 2002 "Comment on time-variation of fundamental constants."
- Marion, H.; Pereira Dos Santos, F.; Abgrall, M.; Zhang, S.; Sortais, Y.; et al. (18 April 2003). "Search for Variations of Fundamental Constants using Atomic Fountain Clocks". Physical Review Letters. 90 (15) 150801. arXiv:physics/0212112. Bibcode:2003PhRvL..90o0801M. doi:10.1103/physrevlett.90.150801. ISSN 0031-9007. PMID 12732023. S2CID 20986115.
- Martins, C.J.A.P; Melchiorri, A; Rocha, G; Trotta, R; Avelino, P.P; Viana, P.T.P (2004). "WMAP constraints on varying α and the promise of reionization". Physics Letters B. 585 (1–2): 29–34. arXiv:astro-ph/0302295. Bibcode:2004PhLB..585...29M. doi:10.1016/j.physletb.2003.11.080. ISSN 0370-2693. S2CID 113017.
- Olive, Keith A.; Pospelov, Maxim; Qian, Yong-Zhong; Coc, Alain; Cassé, Michel; Vangioni-Flam, Elisabeth (23 August 2002). "Constraints on the variations of the fundamental couplings". Physical Review D. 66 (4) 045022. arXiv:hep-ph/0205269. Bibcode:2002PhRvD..66d5022O. doi:10.1103/physrevd.66.045022. ISSN 0556-2821. S2CID 43436585.
- Uzan, Jean-Philippe [in French] (7 April 2003). "The fundamental constants and their variation: observational and theoretical status". Reviews of Modern Physics. 75 (2): 403–455. arXiv:hep-ph/0205340. Bibcode:2003RvMP...75..403U. doi:10.1103/revmodphys.75.403. ISSN 0034-6861. S2CID 118684485.
- Webb, J. K.; Murphy, M. T.; Flambaum, V. V.; Dzuba, V. A.; Barrow, J. D.; Churchill, C. W.; Prochaska, J. X.; Wolfe, A. M. (9 August 2001). "Further Evidence for Cosmological Evolution of the Fine Structure Constant". Physical Review Letters. 87 (9) 091301. arXiv:astro-ph/0012539. Bibcode:2001PhRvL..87i1301W. doi:10.1103/physrevlett.87.091301. ISSN 0031-9007. PMID 11531558. S2CID 40461557.
