= Physical constant =

Universal and unchanging physical quantity

A physical constant is a non-varying quantity that appears in a theory or model of some physical phenomena. Some physical constants appear in models of fundamental phenomena and impact many parts of physics. These constants include the speed of light in vacuum c, the gravitational constant G, the Planck constant h, the electric constant ε_{0}, and the elementary charge e for examples. Tables of the numerical value of these fundamental physical constants or universal constants are carefully maintained and widely consulted. Some physical constants are coefficients or parameters assumed to be constant in specialized models without being universal constants. Examples include the characteristic time, characteristic length, or characteristic number (dimensionless) of a given system, or material constants (e.g., Madelung constant, electrical resistivity, and heat capacity) of a particular material or substance. Physical constants cannot be explained by the theory that incorporates them but their values may be determined by other, more fundamental theories.

Dimensioned constants include the values set by the International System of Units convention in the defining constants and the derived units built upon those constants, as well as many nonstandard constants still in widespread use as units. Dimensionless constants are characteristics of natural phenomena and their values must be measured experimentally. Dimensionless constants may be fundamental, like the fine-structure constant α, which characterizes the strength of the electromagnetic interaction, or they may arise from empirical dimensional analysis.

== Characterizations ==
=== Dimensioned vs dimensionless ===
Physical constants can have dimensions or be dimensionless. The numerical value of a dimensioned constants, those with units, depend upon the system of units adopted for a model description. The numerical values of dimensionless constants are independent of the system of units and must be measured experimentally.

=== Fundamental vs specific ===
Physical constants can be fundamental, have a very broad arena of application, or be specific to a field or a single model. The question as to which constants are "fundamental" is neither straightforward nor meaningless, but a question of interpretation of the physical theory regarded as fundamental. Jean-Marc Lévy-Leblond proposed a classification schemes of three types of constants:

- A: physical properties of particular objects
- B: characteristic of a class of physical phenomena
- C: universal constants

The same physical constant may move from one category to another as the understanding of its role. For example, c, the speed of light, was originally considered a property of light, a specific system (class A above). The discovery and verification of Maxwell's equations connected the same quantity with an entire system, electromagnetism (class B above). When the theory of special relativity emerged, the quantity became a fundamental constant (class C).

The set of physical constants considered to be fundamental change as physical models change. Constants fundamental in one theory may be explained in terms of constants in a more fundamental theory.

== Relationship to units ==
=== Numerical values ===
Whereas the physical quantity indicated by a physical constant does not depend on the unit system used to express the quantity, the numerical values of dimensional physical constants do depend on choice of unit system. The term "physical constant" refers to the physical quantity, and not to the numerical value within any given system of units. For example, the speed of light is defined as having the numerical value of 299792458 when expressed in the SI unit metres per second, and as having the numerical value of 1 when expressed in the natural units Planck length per Planck time. While its numerical value can be defined at will by the choice of units, the speed of light itself is a single physical constant.

Illustration of the SI, with base units and defining constants used to define them: s – the hyperfine structure transition frequency in the caesium atom for the second, kg – the Planck constant for the kilogram, mol – the Avogadro constant for the mole, cd – the luminous efficacy of monochromatic radiation of frequency 540 THz for the candela, K – the Boltzmann constant for the kelvin, A – elementary charge for the ampere, m – the speed of light for the metre.

=== International System of Units ===
All of the units in the International System of Units are defined in terms of seven fixed numerical values of defining constants including three fundamental constants: the speed of light in vacuum, c; the Planck constant, h; and the elementary charge, e. The other defining constants are less familiar, like the hyperfine transition frequency of cesium, written symbolically as Δν_{Cs} Seven more familiar and historically connected base units are built from these defining constants. For example, the SI unit for mass, the kilogram, can be written in terms of defining constants as:

1 kg = (299792458)^{2}/((6.62607015×10^{−34})(9192631770))hΔν_{Cs}/c^{2}.

=== Natural units ===
It is possible to combine dimensional universal physical constants to define fixed quantities of any desired dimension, and this property has been used to construct various systems of natural units of measurement. Depending on the choice and arrangement of constants used, the resulting natural units may be convenient to an area of study. For example, Planck units, constructed from c, G, ħ, and k_{B} give conveniently sized measurement units for use in studies of quantum gravity, and atomic units, constructed from ħ, m_{e}, e and 4πε_{0} give convenient units in atomic physics. The numerical value of results expressed in these convenient units will substantially differ from the numerical value expressed in SI units.

== Number of fundamental constants ==
The number of fundamental physical constants depends on the physical theory accepted as "fundamental". Currently, this is the theory of general relativity for gravitation and the Standard Model for electromagnetic, weak and strong nuclear interactions and the matter fields. Between them, these theories account for a total of 19 independent fundamental constants. There is, however, no single "correct" way of enumerating them, as it is a matter of arbitrary choice which quantities are considered "fundamental" and which as "derived". Uzan lists 22 "fundamental constants of our standard model" as follows:

- the gravitational constant G,
- the speed of light c,
- the Planck constant h,
- the 9 Yukawa couplings for the quarks and leptons (equivalent to specifying the rest mass of these elementary particles),
- 2 parameters of the Higgs field potential,
- 4 parameters for the quark mixing matrix,
- 3 coupling constants for the gauge groups SU(3) × SU(2) × U(1) (or equivalently, two coupling constants and the Weinberg angle),
- a phase for the quantum chromodynamics vacuum.

The number of 19 independent fundamental physical constants is subject to change under possible extensions of the Standard Model, notably by the introduction of neutrino mass (equivalent to seven additional constants, i.e. 3 Yukawa couplings and 4 lepton mixing parameters).

The discovery of variability in any of these constants would be equivalent to the discovery of "new physics".

== Tests on time-independence ==
By definition, dimensionless fundamental physical constants are subject to measurement, so that their being constant (independent on both the time and position of the performance of the measurement) is necessarily an experimental result and subject to verification.

Paul Dirac in 1937 speculated that physical constants such as the gravitational constant or the fine-structure constant might be subject to change over time in proportion of the age of the universe. Experiments can in principle only put an upper bound on the relative change per year. For the fine-structure constant, this upper bound is comparatively low, at roughly 10^{−17} per year (as of 2008).

The gravitational constant is much more difficult to measure with precision, and conflicting measurements in the 2000s have inspired the controversial suggestions of a periodic variation of its value in a 2015 paper. However, while its value is not known to great precision, the possibility of observing type Ia supernovae which happened in the universe's remote past, paired with the assumption that the physics involved in these events is universal, allows for an upper bound of less than 10^{−10} per year for the gravitational constant over the last nine billion years.

Similarly, an upper bound of the change in the proton-to-electron mass ratio has been placed at 10^{−7} over a period of 7 billion years (or 10^{−16} per year) in a 2012 study based on the observation of methanol in a distant galaxy.

It is problematic to discuss the proposed rate of change (or lack thereof) of a single dimensional physical constant in isolation. The reason for this is that the choice of units is arbitrary, making the question of whether a constant is undergoing change an artefact of the choice (and definition) of the units.

For example, in SI units, the speed of light was given a defined value in 1983. Thus, it was meaningful to experimentally measure the speed of light in SI units prior to 1983, but it is not so now. Similarly, with effect from May 2019, the Planck constant has a defined value, such that all SI base units are now defined in terms of fundamental physical constants. With this change, the international prototype of the kilogram is being retired as the last physical object used in the definition of any SI unit.

Tests on the immutability of physical constants look at dimensionless quantities, i.e. ratios between quantities of like dimensions, in order to escape this problem. Changes in physical constants are not meaningful if they result in an observationally indistinguishable universe. For example, a "change" in the speed of light c would be meaningless if accompanied by a corresponding change in the elementary charge e so that the expression e^{2}/2ε_{0}ch (the fine-structure constant) remained unchanged.

== Dimensionless physical constants ==
Any ratio between physical constants of the same dimensions results in a dimensionless physical constant, for example, the proton-to-electron mass ratio. The fine-structure constant α, introduced by Arnold Sommerfeld, is the best known dimensionless fundamental physical constant. It is the value of the elementary charge squared expressed in Planck units. This value has become a standard example when discussing the derivability or non-derivability of physical constants.

== Fine-tuned universe ==
Some physicists have explored the notion that if the dimensionless physical constants had sufficiently different values, our Universe would be so radically different that intelligent life would probably not have emerged, and that our Universe therefore seems to be fine-tuned for intelligent life. The anthropic principle states a logical truism: the fact of our existence as intelligent beings who can measure physical constants requires those constants to be such that beings like us can exist. There are a variety of interpretations of the constants' values, including that of a divine creator (the apparent fine-tuning is actual and intentional), or that the universe is one universe of many in a multiverse (e.g. the many-worlds interpretation of quantum mechanics), or even that, if information is an innate property of the universe and logically inseparable from consciousness, a universe without the capacity for conscious beings cannot exist.

== Table of physical constants ==
The table below lists some frequently used constants and their CODATA recommended values. For an extended list, refer to List of physical constants.

Quantity	Symbol	Value	Relative standard uncertainty
elementary charge	$e$	1.602176634×10^{−19} C	0
Newtonian constant of gravitation	$G$	6.67430(15)×10^{−11} m^{3}⋅kg^{−1}⋅s^{−2}	2.2×10^{−5}
Planck constant	$h$	6.62607015×10^{−34} J⋅Hz^{−1}	0
speed of light in vacuum	$c$	299792458 m⋅s^{−1}	0
vacuum electric permittivity	$\varepsilon_0$	8.8541878188(14)×10^{−12} F⋅m^{−1}	1.6×10^{−10}
vacuum magnetic permeability	$\mu_0$	1.25663706127(20)×10^{−6} N⋅A^{−2}	1.6×10^{−10}
electron mass	$m_{\mathrm{e}}$	9.1093837139(28)×10^{−31} kg	3.1×10^{−10}
fine-structure constant	$\alpha = e^2 / 2 \varepsilon_0 h c$	0.0072973525643(11)	1.6×10^{−10}
Josephson constant	$K_{\mathrm{J}} = 2 e / h$	483597.8484...×10^{9} Hz⋅V^{−1}	0
Rydberg constant	$R_\infin = \alpha^2 m_{\mathrm{e}} c / 2 h$	10973731.568157(12) m^{−1}	1.1×10^{−12}
von Klitzing constant	$R_{\mathrm{K}} = h / e^2$	25812.80745... Ω	0

== See also ==
- List of common physics notations
- List of mathematical constants
- List of physical constants
- Mathematical constant
