= Cabibbo =

Cabibbo is a surname. Notable people with the surname include:

- Nicola Cabibbo (1935–2010), Italian physicist
  - Cabibbo–Kobayashi–Maskawa matrix
- Josef Samael (born 1974), American professional wrestler
