= Bimaximal mixing =

Bimaximal mixing refers to a proposed form of the lepton mixing matrix. It is characterized by the $\nu_3$ neutrino being a bimaximal mixture of $\nu_\mu$ and $\nu_\tau$ and being completely decoupled from the $\nu_e$, i.e. a uniform mixture of $\nu_\mu$ and $\nu_\tau$. The $\nu_e$ is consequently a uniform mixture of $\nu_1$ and $\nu_2$. Other notable properties are the symmetries between the $\nu_\mu$ and $\nu_\tau$ flavours and $\nu_1$ and $\nu_2$ mass eigenstates and an absence of CP violation. The moduli squared of the matrix elements have to be:
$$\begin{bmatrix}
|U_{e 1}|^2 & |U_{e 2}|^2 & |U_{e 3}|^2 \\
|U_{\mu 1}|^2 & |U_{\mu 2}|^2 & |U_{\mu 3}|^2 \\
|U_{\tau 1}|^2 & |U_{\tau 2}|^2 & |U_{\tau 3}|^2
\end{bmatrix} =
\begin{bmatrix} \frac{1}{2} & \frac{1}{2} & 0 \\
\frac{1}{4} & \frac{1}{4} & \frac{1}{2} \\
\frac{1}{4} & \frac{1}{4} & \frac{1}{2}
\end{bmatrix}.$$

According to PDG convention, bimaximal mixing corresponds to $\theta_{12}=\theta_{23}=45^\circ$ and $\theta_{13}=\delta_{13}=0$, which produces the following matrix:
$$\begin{bmatrix}
U_{e 1} & U_{e 2} & U_{e 3} \\
U_{\mu 1} & U_{\mu 2} & U_{\mu 3} \\
U_{\tau 1} & U_{\tau 2} & U_{\tau 3}
\end{bmatrix} =
\begin{bmatrix} \frac{1}{\sqrt{2}} & \frac{1}{\sqrt{2}} & 0 \\
-\frac{1}{2} & \frac{1}{2} & \frac{1}{\sqrt{2}} \\
\frac{1}{2} & -\frac{1}{2} & \frac{1}{\sqrt{2}}
\end{bmatrix}.$$
Alternatively, $\theta_{12}=\theta_{23}=-45^\circ$ and $\theta_{13}=\delta_{13}=0$ can be used, which corresponds to:
$$\begin{bmatrix}
U_{e 1} & U_{e 2} & U_{e 3} \\
U_{\mu 1} & U_{\mu 2} & U_{\mu 3} \\
U_{\tau 1} & U_{\tau 2} & U_{\tau 3}
\end{bmatrix} =
\begin{bmatrix} \frac{1}{\sqrt{2}} & -\frac{1}{\sqrt{2}} & 0 \\
\frac{1}{2} & \frac{1}{2} & -\frac{1}{\sqrt{2}} \\
\frac{1}{2} & \frac{1}{2} & \frac{1}{\sqrt{2}}
\end{bmatrix}.$$

== Phenomenology ==
The L/E flatness of the electron-like event ratio at Super-Kamiokande severely restricts the CP-conserving neutrino mixing matrices to the form:
$$U=
\begin{bmatrix}
\cos\theta & \sin\theta & 0 \\
-\sin\theta/\sqrt{2} & \cos\theta/\sqrt{2} & \frac{1}{\sqrt{2}} \\
\sin\theta/\sqrt{2} & -\cos\theta/\sqrt{2} & \frac{1}{\sqrt{2}}
\end{bmatrix}.$$
Bimaximal mixing corresponds to $\theta=45^\circ$. Tribimaximal mixing and golden-ratio mixing also correspond to an angle in the above parametrization. Bimaximal mixing, along with these other mixing schemes, have been falsified by a non-zero $\theta_{13}$.

== See also ==
- Trimaximal mixing
- Tribimaximal mixing
- Neutrino oscillation
- Double Chooz
