= Quark–lepton complementarity =

The quark–lepton complementarity (QLC) is a possible fundamental symmetry between quarks and leptons. First proposed in 1990 by Foot and Lew, it assumes that leptons as well as quarks come in three "colors". Such theory may reproduce the Standard Model at low energies, and hence quark–lepton symmetry may be realized in nature.

== Possible evidence for QLC ==
Recent neutrino experiments confirm that the Pontecorvo–Maki–Nakagawa–Sakata matrix U_{PMNS} contains large mixing angles. For example, atmospheric measurements of particle decay yield θ^{PMNS}_{23} ≈ 45°, while solar experiments yield θ^{PMNS}_{12} ≈ 34°. Compare these results with θ^{PMNS}_{13} ≈ 9° which is clearly smaller, at about 1/4~1/3× the size, and with the quark mixing angles in the Cabibbo–Kobayashi–Maskawa matrix U_{CKM} . The disparity that nature indicates between quark and lepton mixing angles has been viewed in terms of a "quark–lepton complementarity" which can be expressed in the relations

$$\theta_{12}^\text{PMNS}+\theta_{12}^\text{CKM} \approx 45^\circ \,,$$
$$\theta_{23}^\text{PMNS}+\theta_{23}^\text{CKM} \approx 45^\circ \,.$$

Possible consequences of QLC have been investigated in the literature and in particular a simple correspondence between the PMNS and CKM matrices have been proposed and analyzed in terms of a correlation matrix. The correlation matrix V_{M} is roughly (Note: Since the CKM relates quarks to quarks, and the PMNS matrix relates leptons to leptons, the raw product uses "incompatible" co‑ordinates; at the very least, a unitary matrix should lie between them, to rotate their axes into some kind of alignment of lepton co‑ordinates to quark co‑ordinates, before multiplying them. However, lacking a clear theoretical motivation for any particular rotation as-yet, the product with the matrix axes without any alignment serves to provide estimates which may need later adjustment.) defined as the product of the CKM and PMNS matrices:

$$V_\text{M} = U_\text{CKM} \cdot U_\text{PMNS} \, ,$$

Unitarity implies:

$$U_\text{PMNS} = U^{\dagger}_\text{CKM} V_\text{M} \, .$$

== Open questions ==
One may ask where the large lepton mixings come from, and whether this information is implicit in the form of the V_{M} matrix. This question has been widely investigated in the literature, but its answer is still open. Furthermore, in some Grand Unification Theories (GUTs) the direct QLC correlation between the CKM and the PMNS mixing matrix can be obtained. In this class of models, the V_{M} matrix is determined by the heavy Majorana neutrino mass matrix.

Despite the naïve relations between the PMNS and CKM angles, a detailed analysis shows that the correlation matrix is phenomenologically compatible with a tribimaximal pattern, and only marginally with a bimaximal pattern. It is possible to include bimaximal forms of the correlation matrix V_{M} in models with renormalization effects that are relevant, however, only in particular cases with$\ \tan \beta > 40\$and with quasi-degenerate neutrino masses.

== See also ==
- Leptoquark
