= QLC =

QLC or qlc may refer to:

== Science and technology ==
- Quad-level cell, a type of flash memory
- Quark–lepton complementarity, a possible fundamental symmetry between quarks and leptons
- .QLC, a file extension for ATM Type 1 fonts script; See List of filename extensions (M–R)
- Quantum logic clock

== Other uses ==
- Bedford QLC, a variant of the Bedford QL series of trucks
- Quaid-e-Azam Law College, a private law college in Pakistan
- Osage language (Linguist List code: qlc)
- Kansa language (Linguist List code: qlc)
- Q Light Controller (QLC+), a free and open-source cross-platform show control application

== See also ==
- Quasi-linear convective system (QLCS), a line of thunderstorms
