= Nicola Cabibbo =

Italian physicist (1935-2010)

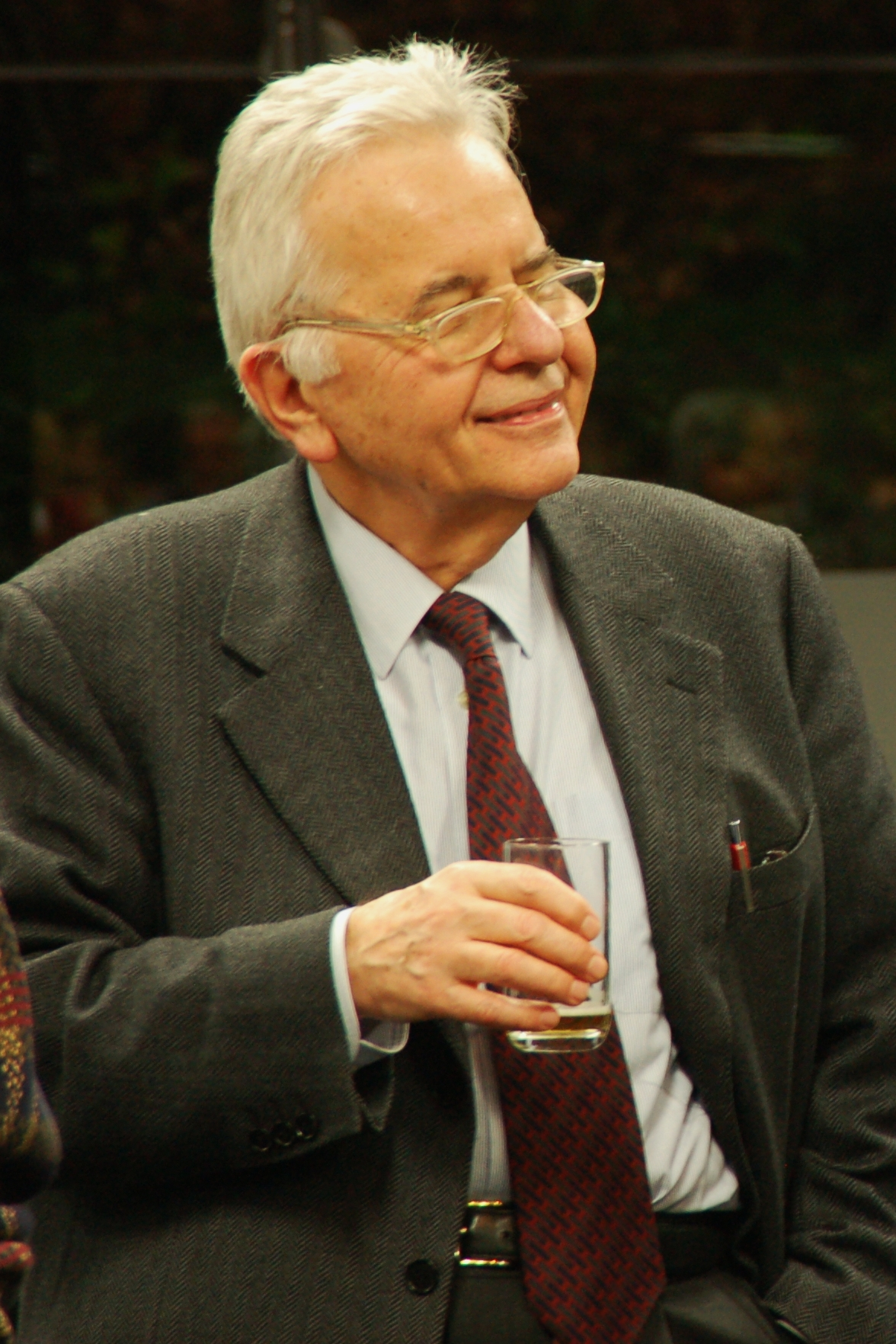
- Cabibbo in 2006
- Born: 10 April 1935; Rome, Italy
- Died: 16 August 2010 (aged 75); Rome, Italy
- Education: Sapienza University of Rome
- Known for: Cabibbo angle
- Spouse: Paola Iandolo (m. 1962)
- Children: 1
- Awards: Sakurai Prize (1989); Matteucci Medal (2002); Pomeranchuk Prize (2009); P.A.M. Dirac Medal (2010); Benjamin Franklin Medal (2011, posthumous)
- Scientific career
- Fields: Particle physics
- Workplaces: Italian National Institute of Nuclear Physics; Pontifical Academy of Sciences
- Academic advisors: Bruno Touschek
- Notable students: Guido Martinelli; Giorgio Parisi; Massimo Testa

Nicola Cabibbo (10 April 1935 – 16 August 2010) was an Italian physicist best known for his work on the weak interaction, particularly his introduction of the Cabibbo angle. Interested in science from a young age, he studied physics at the Sapienza University of Rome, graduating in 1958 with a thesis completed under Bruno Touschek.

== Early life and education ==
Nicola Cabibbo was born on 10 April 1935 in Rome, Italy to Silician parents; his father, Emanuele, was a lawyer and his mother was a housewife. He was interested in mathematics, physics and astronomy from an early age, and built his own radios. Despite growing up during World War II, his elementary school education ran uninterrupted, and he subsequently attended the Liceo Torquato Tasso. There, a textbook titled What Is Mathematics? sparked Cabibbo's interest in pursuing scientific studies.

After the end of the war, Cabibbo also developed an interest in American literature and often frequented the library of the United States embassy to read and borrow books. His favourite authors were Ernest Hemingway, Theodore Dreiser and Herman Melville, but he also enjoyed science fiction and books on arctic expeditions.

Cabibbo enrolled at the Sapienza University of Rome in 1952 and graduated with a degree in physics in 1958. His thesis, which focused on weak interactions and muon decay, was completed under the supervision of Bruno Touschek and was done in collaboration with fellow students Francesco Calogero and Paolo Guidoni.

== Career ==
After graduating, Cabibbo began working for the Rome Division of the Istituto Nazionale di Fisica Nucleare. Two years later, in 1960, he was hired at the Laboratori Nazionali di Frascati, becoming the first theoretical physicist stationed there. (Note: Giorgio Salvini, director of the Frascati laboratories at the time, thought it was necessary to have a theoretical research group to support the laboratories' experimental activities.)

In 1963, while working at CERN, Cabibbo found the solution to the puzzle of the weak decays of strange particles, formulating what came to be known as Cabibbo universality. In 1967 Nicola settled back in Rome where he taught theoretical physics and created a large school. He was president of the INFN from 1983 to 1992, during which time the Gran Sasso Laboratory was inaugurated. He was also president of the Italian energy agency, ENEA, from 1993 to 1998, and was president of the Pontifical Academy of Sciences from 1993 until his death. In 2004, Cabibbo spent a year at CERN as guest professor, joining the NA48/2 collaboration.

== Research ==
The Cabibbo angle represents the rotation of the mass eigenstate vector space formed by the mass eigenstates $\scriptstyle{| d \rangle , \ | s \rangle}$ into the weak eigenstate vector space formed by the weak eigenstates $\scriptstyle{| d^\prime \rangle , \ | s^\prime \rangle}$. The rotation angle is θ_{C} = 13.04°.

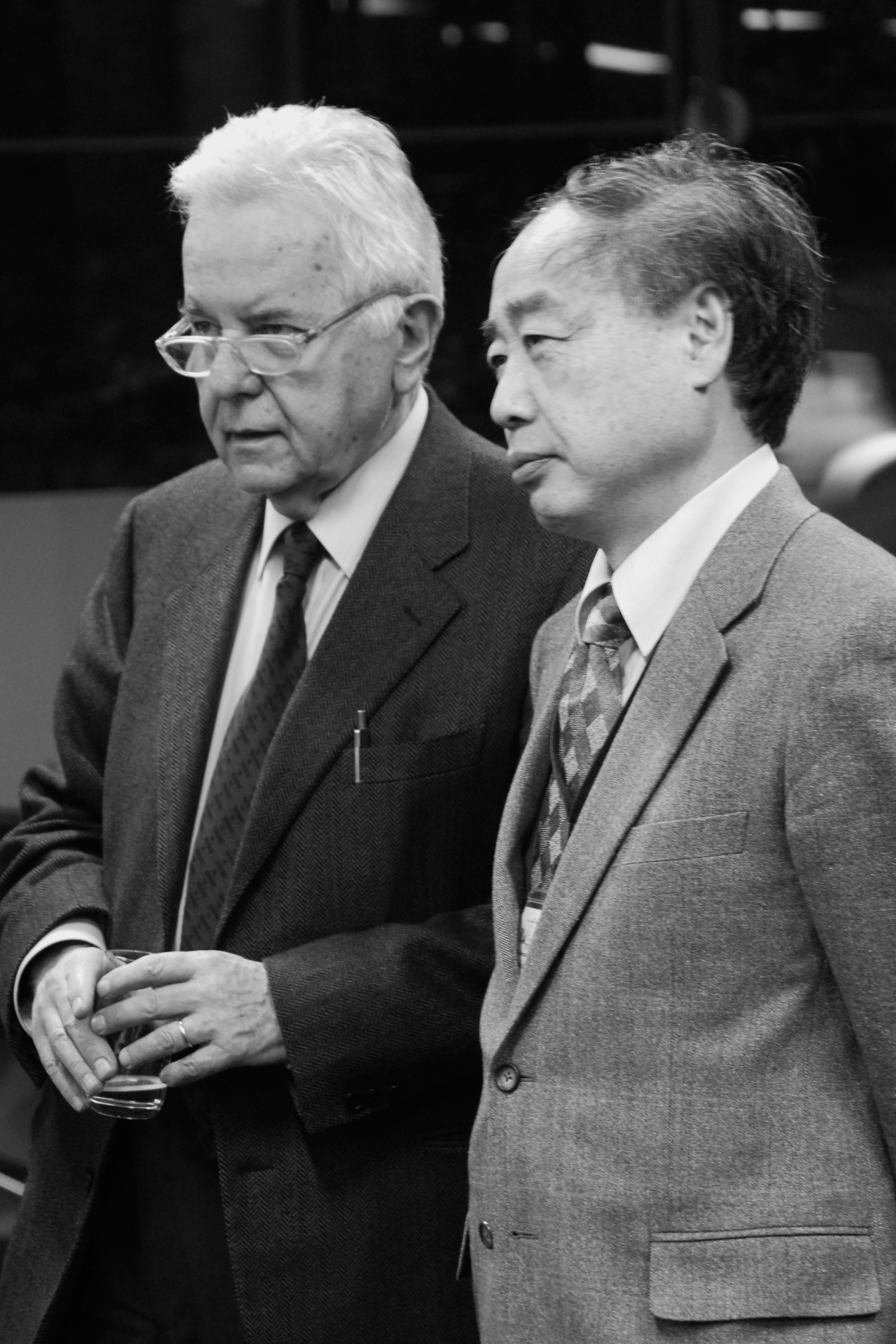
Nicola Cabibbo and Makoto Kobayashi

Cabibbo's major work on the weak interaction originated from a need to explain two observed phenomena:

- The transitions between up and down quarks, between electrons and electron neutrinos, and between muons and muon neutrinos had similar likelihood of occurring (similar amplitudes); and
- The transitions with change in strangeness had amplitudes equal to one fourth of those with no change in strangeness.

Cabibbo addressed these issues, following Murray Gell-Mann and Maurice Lévy, by postulating weak universality, which involves a similarity in the weak interaction coupling strength between different generations of particles. He addressed the second issue with a mixing angle θ_{C} (now called the Cabibbo angle), between the down and strange quarks. Modern measurements show that θ_{C} = 13.04°.

He was awarded the High Energy Particle Physics Prize of the European Physical Society in 1991, "for the theory of weak interactions leading to the concept of quark mixing". Before the discovery of the third generation of quarks, this work was extended by Makoto Kobayashi and Toshihide Maskawa to the Cabibbo–Kobayashi–Maskawa matrix. In 2008, Kobayashi and Maskawa shared one half of the Nobel Prize in Physics for their work. Some physicists had bitter feelings that the Nobel Prize committee failed to reward Cabibbo for his vital part. Asked for a reaction on the prize, Cabibbo preferred to give no comment. According to sources close to him, however, he was embittered.

Later, Cabibbo researched applications of supercomputers to address problems in modern physics with the experiments APE 100 and APE 1000.

Cabibbo supported attempts to rehabilitate executed Italian philosopher Giordano Bruno, citing the apologies on Galileo Galilei as a possible model to correct the historical wrongs done by the Church.

After his death in 2011, the Franklin Institute awarded him with the Benjamin Franklin Medal in Physics.

== Personal life and death ==
In 1962, Cabibbo married Paola Iandolo, who became a professor of North American literature at the University of Salerno and then of American Literature at the Sapienza University of Rome. The couple had one son, Andrea, who was born in 1966 and is a molecular biologist. Cabibbo died on August 16, 2010 at the Fatebenefratelli Hospital in Rome, at the age of 75, after having been admitted for a respiratory failure. He had been suffering from a tumour for several years.

== See also ==
- Cabibbo angle
- Trimaximal mixing

== Notes ==
Catholic Church titles
Preceded by Giovanni Battista Marini Bettòlo Marconi	President of the Pontifical Academy of Sciences; 6 April 1993 – 16 August 2010	Succeeded by Werner Arber
