= List of constants =

List of constants may refer to:

- List of mathematical constants
- List of physical constants
