= Tau neutrino =

Subatomic particle

- Composition: Elementary particle
- Statistics: Fermionic
- Family: Lepton
- Generation: Third
- Interactions: Weak, gravity
- Symbol: ν_{τ}
- Antiparticle: Tau antineutrino (ν̅_{τ})
- Theorized: Mid 1970s
- Discovered: DONUT collaboration (2000)
- Mass: Non-zero (theoretical) <18.2 MeV/c^{2}
- Electric charge: 0 e
- Color charge: No
- Spin: 1/2 ħ
- Weak isospin: 1/2
- Weak hypercharge: −1
- Chirality: left-handed (for right-handed neutrinos, see Sterile neutrino)

The tau neutrino or tauon neutrino is an elementary particle which has the symbol ν_{τ} and zero electric charge. Together with the tau (τ), it forms the third generation of leptons, hence the name tau neutrino. Its existence was immediately implied after the tau particle was detected in a series of experiments between 1974 and 1977 by Martin Lewis Perl with his colleagues at the SLAC–LBL group. The discovery of the tau neutrino was announced in July 2000 by the DONUT collaboration (Direct Observation of the Nu Tau). In 2024, the IceCube Neutrino Observatory published findings of seven astrophysical tau neutrino candidates.

As of 2022 they have been called the "least studied particle in the standard model" because of their low cross section, difficulty of production, and difficulty to distinguish from other neutrino flavors. One review argues they are worth studying more in order to finally completely measure their properties, test our knowledge of neutrino mixing, probe possible anomalies, and make full use of experiments that are sensitive to tau neutrinos in any case.

== Discovery ==
The DONUT experiment from Fermilab was built during the 1990s to specifically detect the tau neutrino. These efforts came to fruition in July 2000, when the DONUT collaboration reported its detection. The tau neutrino is last of the leptons, and is the second most recent discovered particle of the Standard Model (i.e., it was observed 12 years before the discovery of the Higgs boson in 2012).

== Detection ==
Several natural high-energy tau neutrinos have been successfully identified by the IceCube Neutrino Observatory. Tau neutrinos are hard to distinguish from electron neutrinos in ice-based neutrino detectors because they produce similar patterns of photons as electron neutrinos do. Electron neutrinos and tau neutrinos, in contrast to muon neutrinos, both cause sphere-shaped photon detection patterns in ice. When an electron neutrino interacts with an ice-based detector, it produces an electron, which does not travel far before hitting an atom and releasing a spherical photon pattern. Tau neutrinos produce a tau particle, which emits a ball of photons twice – when it is produced and when it decays. However, these one-ball and two-ball patterns are very difficult to distinguish except for very high-energy tau neutrinos, which cause the tau particle to travel further between production and decay, making the pattern more distinguishable from a sphere.

== See also ==
- Electron neutrino
- Muon neutrino
- PMNS matrix
