= DONUT =

Experiment at Fermilab

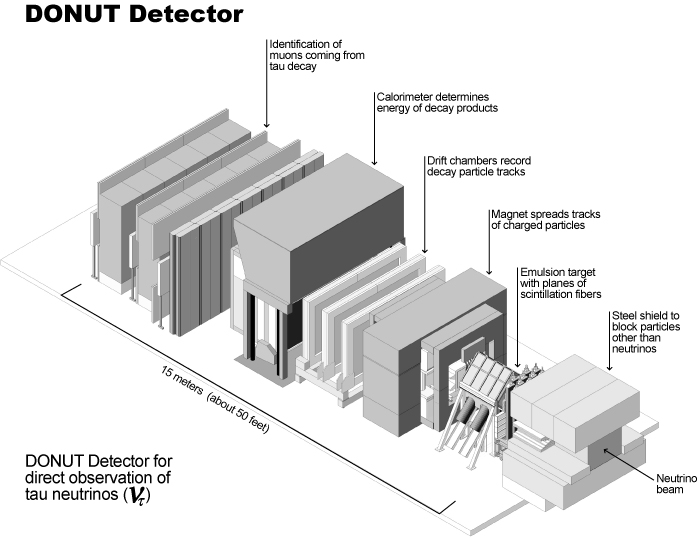
Schematic overview of the DONUT detector

DONUT (Direct observation of the nu tau, E872) was an experiment at Fermilab dedicated to the search for tau neutrino interactions. The detector operated during a few months in the summer of 1997, and successfully detected the tau neutrino. It confirmed the existence of the last lepton predicted by the Standard Model. The data from the experiment was also used to put an upper limit on the tau neutrino magnetic moment and measure its interaction cross section.

== Principle ==
In DONUT, protons accelerated by the Tevatron were used to produce tau neutrinos via decay of charmed mesons. After eliminating as many unwanted background particles as possible by a system of magnets and bulk matter (mostly iron and concrete), the beam passed through several sheets of nuclear emulsion. In very rare cases one of the neutrinos would interact in the detector, producing electrically charged particles which left visible tracks in the emulsion and could be electronically registered by a system of scintillators and drift chambers.

Using the electronic information, possible neutrino interactions were identified and selected for further analysis. This meant photographically developing the emulsion sheets so any traces left by particles passing through them would show up as a small black dot. By connecting these dots across subsequent sheets, the path that each particle had taken was reconstructed and likely neutrino interactions identified. The characteristic properties of neutrino interactions were that several tracks suddenly appeared without any leading up to them. The tau neutrino was identified by one of those tracks showing a "kink" after a few millimeters, indicating decay of a tau lepton.

== Result ==
In July 2000, the DONUT collaboration announced the first observation of tau neutrino interactions. This result was based on only four events, but the signal was far in excess of the expected background (0.34±0.05 events), and has a p-value of 4×10^{−4}, around 3.5 sigma. This falls below the normal standard of proof, but was generally accepted because the particle was expected to be there. The final report of 2008 identifies 9 tau neutrino events from a total sample of 578 neutrino events. Its significance lies in the fact that the tau neutrino had so far remained the only particle of the Standard Model that had not been directly observed except for the Higgs boson.

Other than the result itself, DONUT also allowed validation of new techniques for high energy neutrino detection, notably the Emulsion Cloud Chamber, in which nuclear emulsion sheets are interspersed with layers of iron, leading to an increase in the number of interactions.

== See also ==
- PMNS matrix
- Nu (letter)
