= Mixing angle =

Angle between orthogonal basis vectors in particle physics and quantum mechanics

In particle physics and quantum mechanics, mixing angles are the angles between two sets of (complex-valued) orthogonal basis vectors, or states, usually the eigenbases of two quantum mechanical operators. The choice of angles (parameterization) is not unique but based on convention.

== Mathematics ==
The relation between two eigenbases is described completely by a unitary matrix, the analogue of a rotation matrix in a complex vector space. The number of degrees of freedom in this matrix is usually reduced by removing any excess complex phase from the transformation, since in most cases that is not a measurable quantity.

For two-dimensional vector space this reduces the matrix to a rotation matrix, which can be described completely by one mixing angle. In a three dimensional space there are three mixing angles and one additional complex phase parameter. Different conventions exist for how the three angles are defined, such as Euler angles.

== Probabilistic Interpretation ==
Given a quantum state (vector in a Hilbert space) $|\psi\rangle$, its inner product with another state $|\phi\rangle$ is a probability amplitude. When the square-modulus is taken, $\left|\langle\phi|\psi\rangle\right|^2$ gives the probability that the system will be in state $|\phi\rangle$.

For a two-state system, where most will first encounter the mixing angle, the basis of this Hilbert space will be two-dimensional, often with basis vectors denoted $|0\rangle,\ |1\rangle$. An arbitrary state in this basis can be parametrized by an angle $\theta$: one can write $|\Psi\rangle = \cos\theta|0\rangle + \sin\theta|1\rangle$. Such a parametrization is normalizable, and allows us to define different states in terms of $\theta$.

The mixing angle between these two states is the difference in exactly the angle $\theta$ between the states. As was previously stated, this angle is deeply related to the probability of finding state $|\psi\rangle$ in state $|\phi\rangle$, computed by $\left|\langle\phi|\psi\rangle\right|^2= \cos^2\vartheta_\text{mixing}$.

Proof

$$\begin{aligned}
&\text{Let }|\psi\rangle = \cos\theta_1|0\rangle + \sin\theta_1|1\rangle\\ &\text{and let } |\phi\rangle = \cos\theta_2|0\rangle + \sin\theta_2|1\rangle.\\ &\text{Then, } \left|\langle \phi|\psi\rangle\right|^2 = \left(\cos\theta_1\cos\theta_2 + \sin\theta_1\sin\theta_2\right)^2 = \cos^2(\theta_1 - \theta_2).\\ &\text{Defining }\vartheta_\text{mixing} \equiv |\theta_1 - \theta_2| \text{, } \left|\langle \phi|\psi\rangle\right|^2 = \cos^2\theta_\text{mixing}
\end{aligned}$$

== Notable mixing angles ==
Some notable mixing angles in particle physics are:

- Neutrino mixing angles (PMNS matrix), describing the mixing between the mass and flavour eigenstates of neutrinos, which explains neutrino oscillations.
- Quark mixing angles including the Cabbibo angle (CKM matrix), describing the mixing between the mass and flavour eigenstates of quarks.
- The Weinberg angle or weak mixing angle, describing the mixing between and relative strength of the electromagnetic and weak forces.
- Higgs mixing angle
