= Trimaximal mixing =

Fermion mixing configuration

Trimaximal mixing (also known as threefold maximal mixing) refers to the highly symmetric, maximally CP-violating, $3 \times 3$ fermion mixing configuration, characterised by a unitary matrix ($U$) having all its elements equal in modulus ($|U_{ai}|=1/\sqrt{3}$, $a,i=1,2,3$) as may be written, e.g.:

$$U=
\begin{bmatrix}
\frac{1}{\sqrt{3}} & \frac{1}{\sqrt{3}} & \frac{1}{\sqrt{3}} \\
\frac{\omega}{\sqrt{3}} & \frac{1}{\sqrt{3}} & \frac{\bar{\omega}}{\sqrt{3}} \\
\frac{\bar{\omega}}{\sqrt{3}} & \frac{1}{\sqrt{3}} & \frac{\omega}{\sqrt{3}}
\end{bmatrix}
\Rightarrow (|U_{i\alpha}|^2)=
\begin{bmatrix}
\frac{1}{3} & \frac{1}{3} & \frac{1}{3} \\
\frac{1}{3} & \frac{1}{3} & \frac{1}{3} \\
\frac{1}{3} & \frac{1}{3} & \frac{1}{3}
\end{bmatrix}$$

where $\omega=\exp(i2\pi/3)$ and $\bar{\omega}=\exp(-i2\pi/3)$ are the complex cube roots of unity. In the standard PDG convention, trimaximal mixing corresponds to: $\theta_{12}=\theta_{23}=\pi/4$, $\theta_{13}=\sin^{-1}(1/\sqrt{3})$ and $\delta=\pi/2$. The Jarlskog $CP$-violating parameter $J$ takes its extremal value $|J|=1/(6\sqrt{3})$.

Originally proposed as a candidate lepton mixing matrix, and actively studied as such (and even as a candidate quark mixing matrix), trimaximal mixing is now definitively ruled-out as a phenomenologically viable lepton mixing scheme by neutrino oscillation experiments, especially the Chooz reactor experiment, in favour of the no longer tenable (related) tribimaximal mixing scheme.
