= List of physical constants =

The constants listed here are known values of physical constants expressed in SI units. Many of these are redundant, in the sense that they obey a known relationship with other physical constants and can be determined from them.

== Table of physical constants ==
Symbol	Quantity	Value (Note: The values are given in the so-called concise form; the number in parentheses is the standard uncertainty and indicates the amount by which the least significant digits of the value are uncertain.) (Note: In some instances an exact value has been displayed, calculated from the defining expression, rather than the incomplete decimal expansion as given by the source.)	Relative standard uncertainty	Ref
$c$	speed of light in vacuum	299792458 m⋅s^{−1}	0	
$h$	Planck constant	6.62607015×10^{−34} J⋅Hz^{−1}	0	
$\hbar = h/2\pi$	reduced Planck constant	1.054571817...×10^{−34} J⋅s	0	
$k, k_{\text{B}}$	Boltzmann constant	1.380649×10^{−23} J⋅K^{−1}	0	
$G$	Newtonian constant of gravitation	6.67430(15)×10^{−11} m^{3}⋅kg^{−1}⋅s^{−2}	2.2×10^{−5}	
$\Lambda$	cosmological constant	1.089(29)×10^{−52} m^{−2} (Note: Planck Collaboration); 1.088(30)×10^{−52} m^{−2} (Note: 6-parameter ΛCDM fit)	0.027; 0.028	
$\sigma = \pi^2 k_{\text{B}}^4 / 60 \hbar^3 c^2$	Stefan–Boltzmann constant	5.670374419...×10^{−8} W⋅m^{−2}⋅K^{−4}	0	
$c_1 = 2 \pi h c^2$	first radiation constant	3.741771852...×10^{−16} W⋅m^{2}	0	
$c_{\text{1L}} = 2 h c^2 / \mathrm{sr}$	first radiation constant for spectral radiance	1.191042972...×10^{−16} W⋅m^{2}⋅sr^{−1}	0	
$c_2 = h c / k_{\text{B}}$	second radiation constant	1.438776877...×10^{−2} m⋅K	0	
$b$ (Note: $b=\left(5+W_0\left(-5e^{-5}\right)\right)^{-1}\frac{hc}{k}$, where $W_0$ is the principal branch of the Lambert W function.)	Wien wavelength displacement law constant	2.897771955...×10^{−3} m⋅K	0	
$b'$ (Note: $b' = \left(3+W_0\left(-3e^{-3}\right)\right)\frac{k}{h}$, where $W_0$ is the principal branch of the Lambert W function.)	Wien frequency displacement law constant	5.878925757...×10^{10} Hz⋅K^{−1}	0	
$b_\text{entropy}$	Wien entropy displacement law constant	3.002916077...×10^{−3} m⋅K	0	
$e$	elementary charge	1.602176634×10^{−19} C	0	
$G_0 = 2 e^2 / h$	conductance quantum	7.748091729...×10^{−5} S	0	
$G_0^{-1} = h / 2 e^2$	inverse conductance quantum	12906.40372... Ω	0	
$R_{\text{K}} = h / e^2$	von Klitzing constant	25812.80745... Ω	0	
$K_{\text{J}} = 2 e / h$	Josephson constant	483597.8484...×10^{9} Hz⋅V^{−1}	0	
$\Phi_0 = h / 2 e$	magnetic flux quantum	2.067833848...×10^{−15} Wb	0	
$\alpha = e^2 / 4 \pi \varepsilon_0 \hbar c$	fine-structure constant	0.0072973525643(11)	1.6×10^{−10}	
$\alpha^{-1}$	inverse fine-structure constant	137.035999177(21)	1.6×10^{−10}	
$\mu_0 = 4\pi\alpha\hbar/e^2c$	vacuum magnetic permeability	1.25663706127(20)×10^{−6} N⋅A^{−2}	1.6×10^{−10}	
$Z_0 = 4\pi\alpha\hbar/e^2$	characteristic impedance of vacuum	376.730313412(59) Ω	1.6×10^{−10}	
$\varepsilon_0 = e^2/4\pi\alpha\hbar c$	vacuum electric permittivity	8.8541878188(14)×10^{−12} F⋅m^{−1}	1.6×10^{−10}	
$m_{\text{e}}$	electron mass	9.1093837139(28)×10^{−31} kg	3.1×10^{−10}	
$m_\mu$	muon mass	1.883531627(42)×10^{−28} kg	2.2×10^{−8}	
$m_\tau$	tau mass	3.16754(21)×10^{−27} kg	6.8×10^{−5}	
$m_{\text{p}}$	proton mass	1.67262192595(52)×10^{−27} kg	3.1×10^{−10}	
$m_{\text{n}}$	neutron mass	1.67492750056(85)×10^{−27} kg	5.1×10^{−10}	
$m_{\text{p}}/m_\text{e}$	proton-to-electron mass ratio	1836.152673426(32)	1.7×10^{−11}	
$m_{\text{W}} / m_{\text{Z}}$	W-to-Z mass ratio	0.88145(13)	1.5×10^{−4}	
$\sin^2 \theta_{\text{W}}$ $= 1 - (m_{\text{W}} / m_{\text{Z}})^2$	sine-square weak mixing angle	0.22305(23) (Note: CODATA value); 0.23121(4) (Note: minimal subtraction scheme definition); 0.23153(4) (Note: effective angle definition)	1.0×10^{−3} 1.7×10^{−4} 1.7×10^{−4}	
$g_{\text{e}}$	electron g-factor	−2.00231930436092(36)	1.8×10^{−13}	
$g_{\mu}$	muon g-factor	−2.00233184123(82)	4.1×10^{−10}	
$g_{\text{p}}$	proton g-factor	5.5856946893(16)	2.9×10^{−10}	
$h / 2 m_{\text{e}}$	quantum of circulation	3.6369475467(11)×10^{−4} m^{2}⋅s^{−1}	3.1×10^{−10}	
$\mu_{\text{B}} = e \hbar / 2 m_{\text{e}}$	Bohr magneton	9.2740100657(29)×10^{−24} J⋅T^{−1}	3.1×10^{−10}	
$\mu_{\text{N}} = e \hbar / 2 m_\text{p}$	nuclear magneton	5.0507837393(16)×10^{−27} J⋅T^{−1}	3.1×10^{−10}	
$r_{\text{e}} = \alpha \hbar / m_{\text{e}} c$	classical electron radius	2.8179403205(13)×10^{−15} m	4.7×10^{−10}	
$\sigma_{\text{e}} = (8 \pi / 3)r_{\text{e}}^2$	Thomson cross section	6.6524587051(62)×10^{−29} m^{2}	9.3×10^{−10}	
$a_0 = \hbar / \alpha m_\text{e} c$	Bohr radius	5.29177210544(82)×10^{−11} m	1.6×10^{−10}	
$R_{\infin} = \alpha^2 m_{\text{e}} c / 2 h$	Rydberg constant	10973731.568157(12) m^{−1}	1.1×10^{−12}	
$\mathrm{Ry} = R_{\infin}hc = E_{\text{h}}/2$	Rydberg unit of energy	2.1798723611030(24)×10^{−18} J	1.1×10^{−12}	
$E_{\text{h}} = \alpha^2 m_{\text{e}} c^2$	Hartree energy	4.3597447222060(48)×10^{−18} J	1.1×10^{−12}	
$G_{\text{F}} / (\hbar c)^3$	Fermi coupling constant	1.1663787(6)×10^{−5} GeV^{−2}	5.1×10^{−7}	
$N_{\text{A}}$	Avogadro constant	6.02214076×10^{23} mol^{−1}	0	
$R = N_{\text{A}} k_{\text{B}}$	molar gas constant	8.31446261815324 J⋅mol^{−1}⋅K^{−1}	0	
$F = N_{\text{A}} e$	Faraday constant	96485.3321233100184 C⋅mol^{−1}	0	
$N_{\text{A}} h$	molar Planck constant	3.9903127128934314×10^{−10} J⋅s⋅mol^{−1}	0	
$M({}^{12}\text{C}) = N_{\text{A}} m({}^{12}\text{C})$	molar mass of carbon-12	12.0000000126(37)×10^{−3} kg⋅mol^{−1}	3.1×10^{−10}	
$m_{\text{u}} = m({}^{12}\text{C}) / 12$	atomic mass constant	1.66053906892(52)×10^{−27} kg	3.1×10^{−10}	
$M_{\text{u}} = M({}^{12}\text{C}) / 12$	molar mass constant	1.00000000105(31)×10^{−3} kg⋅mol^{−1}	3.1×10^{−10}	
$V_{\text{m}}(\text{Si})$	molar volume of silicon	1.205883199(60)×10^{−5} m^{3}⋅mol^{−1}	4.9×10^{−8}	
$\Delta\nu_{\text{Cs}}$	hyperfine transition frequency of ^{133}Cs	9192631770 Hz	0	

== Uncertainties ==
While the values of the physical constants are independent of the system of units in use, each uncertainty as stated reflects our lack of knowledge of the corresponding value as expressed in SI units, and is strongly dependent on how those units are defined. For example, the atomic mass constant $m_{\text{u}}$ is exactly known when expressed using the dalton (its value is exactly 1 Da), but the kilogram is not exactly known when using these units, the opposite of when expressing the same quantities using the kilogram.

== Technical constants ==
Some of these constants are of a technical nature and do not give any true physical property, but they are included for convenience. Such a constant gives the correspondence ratio of a technical dimension with its corresponding underlying physical dimension. These include the Boltzmann constant $k_{\text{B}}$, which gives the correspondence of the dimension temperature to the dimension of energy per degree of freedom, and the Avogadro constant $N_{\text{A}}$, which gives the correspondence of the dimension of amount of substance with the dimension of count of entities (the latter formally regarded in the SI as being dimensionless). By implication, any product of powers of such constants is also such a constant, such as the molar gas constant $R$.

== See also ==
- List of mathematical constants
- Mathematical constant
- Physical constant
- List of particles
