= Yoshio Koide =

Japanese theoretical physicist

Yoshio Koide (小出 義夫, Koide Yoshio; born May 16, 1942, in Kanazawa, Ishikawa) is a Japanese theoretical physicist specializing in particle physics. He is best known for the Koide formula, a relation among the masses of charged leptons that has attracted attention for its surprising accuracy. While some physicists regard the formula as potentially significant, others consider it to be a numerical coincidence.

== Early life and education ==
Koide received a B.Sc. in physics in 1967 from Kanazawa University, followed by an M.Sc. in theoretical elementary particle physics at the same institution later that year. In 1970, he was awarded a Doctor of Science degree from Hiroshima University for his thesis “On the Two-Body Bound State Problem of Dirac Particles.”

== Career ==
After working as a postdoc in the physics department of Hiroshima University and then a postdoc in the applied mathematics department of Osaka University, he became, from 1972 to 1973, a Lecturer in the School of Science and Engineering, Kinki University, Osaka. Koide was Assistant Professor (1973-1977) then Associate Professor (1977-1987) of General Education, Shizuoka Women's University, Shizuoka. From April 1987 to March 2007 he was a Professor of Physics at University of Shizuoka, Shizuoka and then retired as professor emeritus. In 1986 he was a visiting professor at the University of Maryland and in 2002 a visiting researcher at CERN. Koide was from April 2007 to March 2009, a guest professor at Research Institute for Higher Education and Practice, Osaka University, then from April 2009 to March 2011 a guest professor and from April 2011 a guest researcher at Osaka University, and from April 2010 a professor, Department of Maskawa Institute, Kyoto Sangyo University, Kyoto.

== Contributions to physics ==
In the composite model of mesons, Koide's thesis demonstrated that a mass $m$ of a composite particle which consists of the rest masses $m_1,m_2$ cannot be lighter than $\frac{1}{2} (m_1+m_2)$ except for the case $m_1 = m_2$ when J^{P} is not = 0^{-}. This offered a severe problem for the quark model. (Koide’s work was done before the establishment of QCD.)

Katuya and Koide predicted that lifetimes of D^{±} and D^{0} should be considerably different from what was at that time the conventional anticipation tau(D^{±})= tau(D^{0}). Their prediction of these lifetimes was the first in the world prior to the experimental observation.

He published the famous Koide formula in 1982 with a different presentation in 1983.

Originally, Koide's proposed charged lepton mass formula was based on a composite model of quarks and leptons. In a 1990 paper, from the standpoint that the charged leptons are elementary, by introducing a scalar boson with (octet + singlet) of a family symmetry U(3), Koide re-derived the charged lepton mass formula from minimizing conditions for the scalar potential.

In 2009, he related the neutrino mixing matrix to the up-quark mass matrix. Koide and Hiroyuki Nishiura have published articles on a quark and lepton mass matrix model and a neutrino mass matrix model.
