= Tribimaximal mixing =

Tribimaximal mixing is a specific postulated form for the Pontecorvo–Maki–Nakagawa–Sakata (PMNS) lepton mixing matrix U. Tribimaximal mixing is defined by a particular choice of the matrix of moduli-squared of the elements of the PMNS matrix as follows:

$$\begin{bmatrix}
|U_{e 1}|^2 & |U_{e 2}|^2 & |U_{e 3}|^2 \\
|U_{\mu 1}|^2 & |U_{\mu 2}|^2 & |U_{\mu 3}|^2 \\
|U_{\tau 1}|^2 & |U_{\tau 2}|^2 & |U_{\tau 3}|^2
\end{bmatrix}
=
\begin{bmatrix}
\frac{2}{3} & \frac{1}{3} & 0 \\
\frac{1}{6} & \frac{1}{3} & \frac{1}{2} \\
\frac{1}{6} & \frac{1}{3} & \frac{1}{2}
\end{bmatrix}.$$

This mixing is historically interesting as it is quite close to reality when compared to other simple hypotheses where the squares of matrix elements take exact ratios, and also compared to the naive supposition that the matrix would be approximately diagonal like the CKM matrix. However the precision of modern experiments mean that such a simple form is excluded by experiment at a level of over 5σ, mainly due to the fact the tribimaximal scheme has a zero in the $U_{e3}$ element, but also (to a much lesser extent) because it predicts no violation of CP symmetry.

The tribimaximal mixing form was compatible with pre-2011 neutrino oscillation experiments and may be used as a zeroth-order approximation to more general forms for the PMNS matrix, including some that are consistent with the data. In the PDG convention for the PMNS matrix, tribimaximal mixing may be specified in terms of lepton mixing angles as follows:

$$\begin{matrix}
\theta_{12}=\sin^{-1} \left({\frac{1}{\sqrt{3}}}\right)\simeq 35.3^{\circ} & \theta_{23}=\sin^{-1} \left({\frac{1}{\sqrt{2}}}\right)=45^{\circ} & \theta_{13}=0; & (\delta \text{ is undefined}).
\end{matrix}$$

The above prediction has been falsified experimentally, because θ_{13} was found to be nontrivial, θ_{13} =8.5°.

A non-negligible value of θ_{13} has been foreseen in certain theoretical schemes that were put forward before tribimaximal mixing and that supported a large solar mixing, before it was confirmed experimentally (these theoretical schemes do not have a special name, but for the reasons explained above, they could be called pre-tribimaximal or also non-tribimaximal). This situation is not new: also in the 1990s, the solar mixing angle was supposed to be small by most theorists, until KamLAND proved the contrary to be true.

== Explanation of name ==
The name tribimaximal reflects the commonality of the tribimaximal mixing matrix with two previously proposed specific forms for the PMNS matrix, the trimaximal and bimaximal mixing schemes, both now ruled out by data. In tribimaximal mixing, the $\nu_2$ neutrino mass eigenstate is said to be "trimaximally mixed" in that it consists of a uniform admixture of $\nu_e$, $\nu_{\mu}$ and $\nu_{\tau}$ flavour eigenstates, i.e. maximal mixing among all three flavour states. The $\nu_3$ neutrino mass eigenstate, on the other hand, is "bimaximally mixed" in that it comprises a uniform admixture of only two flavour components, i.e. $\nu_{\mu}$ and $\nu_{\tau}$ maximal mixing, with effective decoupling of the $\nu_e$ from the $\nu_3$, just as in the original bimaximal scheme.

== Phenomenology ==
By virtue of the zero ($\ |U_{e3}|^2 = 0\$) in the tribimaximal mixing matrix, exact tribimaximal mixing would predict zero for all CP-violating asymmetries in the case of Dirac neutrinos (in the case of Majorana neutrinos, Majorana phases are still permitted, and could still lead to CP-violating effects).

For solar neutrinos the large angle MSW effect in tribimaximal mixing accounts for the experimental data, predicting average suppressions $\ \langle P_{ee} \rangle \simeq \tfrac{1}{3}\$ in the Sudbury Neutrino Observatory (SNO) and $\ \langle P_{ee}\rangle \simeq \tfrac{5}{9}\$ in lower energy solar neutrino experiments (and in long baseline reactor neutrino experiments). The bimaximally mixed $\ \nu_3\$ in tribimaximal mixing accounts for the factor of two suppression $\ \langle P_{\mu \mu}\rangle \simeq \tfrac{1}{2}\$ observed for atmospheric muon-neutrinos (and confirmed in long-baseline accelerator experiments). Near-zero $\ \nu_e\$ appearance in a $\ \nu_\mu\$ beam is predicted in exact tribimaximal mixing ($\ |U_{e3}|^2 = 0\$), and this has been strongly ruled out by modern reactor neutrino experiments. Further characteristic predictions of tribimaximal mixing – e.g. for very long baseline $\ \nu_\mu\$ and $\ \nu_\tau\$ vacuum survival probabilities $\ P_{\mu \mu} = P_{\tau \tau} \simeq \tfrac{7}{18}\$ – will be extremely hard to test experimentally.

The L/E flatness of the electron-like event ratio at Super-Kamiokande severely restricts the neutrino mixing matrices to the form given by Stancu & Ahluwalia (1999):

$$U=
\begin{bmatrix}
\qquad ~ \cos\theta  &               \qquad \qquad   \sin\theta  &    \qquad  0 ~~ \\
-\frac{1}{\sqrt{2\ }} \sin\theta  & \qquad ~~ \frac{1}{\sqrt{2\ }} \cos\theta & \qquad \frac{1}{\sqrt{2\ }} ~~ \\
~~ \frac{1}{\sqrt{2\ }} \sin\theta  & \qquad   -\frac{1}{\sqrt{2\ }} \cos\theta & \qquad \frac{1}{\sqrt{2\ }} ~~
\end{bmatrix} ~.$$

Additional experimental data fixes $\ \sin \theta = \tfrac{1}{\sqrt{3\ }} ~.$ The extension of this result to the CP-violating case is found in Ahluwalia, Liu, & Stancu (2002).

== History ==
The name tribimaximal first appeared in the literature in 2002 although this specific scheme had been previously published in 1999 as a viable alternative to the trimaximal scheme. Tribimaximal mixing is sometimes confused with other mixing schemes, e.g. which differ from tribimaximal mixing by row- and/or column-wise permutations of the mixing-matrix elements. Such permuted forms are experimentally distinct however, and are now ruled out by data.

That the L/E flatness of the electron-like event ratio at Superkamiokande severely restricts the neutrino mixing matrices was first presented by D. V. Ahluwalia in a Nuclear and Particle Physics Seminar of the Los Alamos National Laboratory on June 5, 1998. It was just a few hours after the Super-Kamiokande press conference that announced the results on atmospheric neutrinos.
