= Proton-to-electron mass ratio =

Physical constant

In physics, the proton-to-electron mass ratio (symbol μ or β) is the rest mass of the proton (a baryon found in atoms) divided by that of the electron (a lepton found in atoms), a dimensionless quantity, namely:

μ = m_{p}/m_{e} = 1836.152673426(32).

The number in parentheses is the measurement uncertainty on the last two digits, corresponding to a relative standard uncertainty of 1.7×10^{−11}.

== Variation of μ over time ==
Astrophysicists have tried to find evidence that μ has changed over the history of the universe. (The same question has also been asked of the fine-structure constant.) One interesting cause of such change would be change over time in the strength of the strong force.

Astronomical searches for time-varying μ have typically examined the Lyman series and Werner transitions of molecular hydrogen which, given a sufficiently large redshift, occur in the optical region and so can be observed with ground-based spectrographs.

If μ were to change, then the change in the wavelength λ_{i} of each rest frame wavelength can be parameterised as:

$$\ \lambda_i=\lambda_0 \left[ 1+K_i \frac{\Delta\mu}\mu \right],$$

where Δμ/μ is the proportional change in μ and K_{i} is a constant which must be calculated within a theoretical (or semi-empirical) framework.

Analysis of the molecular spectra from distant stars for a variety of molecules that the variation in the ratio of the masses is smaller than one part in 10^{7} over cosmological time. Measurements have been made with several molecules, including H_{2}, methanol, ammonia, and carbon monoxide. The results are consistent across these measurements but they have different systematic errors.

== A mathematical coincidence ==
In a famously brief two-sentence paper published in Physical Review in 1951, Friedrich Lenz observed that the best experimental value for the mass ratio at the time (1836.12 ± 0.05) coincided almost perfectly with the mathematical expression 6$\pi^5$. This is now believed to be a mathematical coincidence, since modern measurements with higher precision show the values are remarkably close but not identical: $\mu = {m_p}/{m_e} = 1836.152673426(32)$ while $6 \pi^5 \approx 1836.118109$.

== See also ==
- Koide formula
