= Koide formula =

Unexplained empirical equation in particle physics

The three particles whose masses are found in the Koide formula. Mass is expressed in eV/c^{2}.

The Koide formula is an unexplained empirical equation proposed by Yoshio Koide ([ko.i.de]) in 1981. It relates the masses of the charged leptons, the electron, muon and tau in the following way:

$$Q = \frac{m_\text{e} + m_\mu + m_\tau}{\left( \sqrt{ m_\text{e} } + \sqrt{ m_\mu } + \sqrt{ m_\tau } \right)^2} = \frac{ 2 }{ 3 } ,$$

This exact value of $\frac{2}{3}$ is still within experimental bounds as of 2024.

Koide's formula was first derived based on a preon model that also predicted values for quarks and CKM angles. However, these other predictions are now ruled out experimentally.

Later authors have extended similar relations to neutrinos, quarks, and other families of particles.

== Overview ==
The Koide formula is given as:

$$Q = \frac{m_\text{e} + m_\mu + m_\tau}{\left( \sqrt{ m_\text{e} } + \sqrt{ m_\mu } + \sqrt{ m_\tau } \right)^2} = \frac{ 2 }{ 3 } ,$$

The masses of the electron, muon, and tau are measured respectively as m_{e} = 0.51099895000(15) MeV/c^{2}, m_{μ} = 105.6583755(23) MeV/c^{2}, and m_{τ} = 1776.93(09) MeV/c^{2}; the digits in parentheses are the uncertainties in the last digits. This gives Q = 0.66666446(508). (Note: Since the uncertainties in m_{e} and m_{μ} are much smaller than that in m_{τ}, the uncertainty in Q was calculated as $\Delta Q = \frac{ \partial Q }{ \partial m_\tau } \Delta m_\tau .$) This means that the formula's prediction is currently accurate within experimental bounds.

The mystery is in the physical value. Not only is the result peculiar, in that three ostensibly arbitrary numbers give a simple fraction, but also in that in the case of electron, muon, and tau, Q is exactly halfway between the two extremes of all possible combinations: 1 / 3 (if the three masses were equal) and 1 (if one mass dwarfs the other two). Q is a dimensionless quantity, so the relation holds regardless of which unit is used to express the magnitudes of the masses.

Robert Foot also interpreted the Koide formula as a geometrical relation, in which the value $\textstyle \frac{ 1 }{3 Q}$ is the squared cosine of the angle between the vector $[ \sqrt{ m_\text{e} }, \sqrt{ m_\mu }, \sqrt{ m_\tau } ]$ and the vector [1, 1, 1] (see Dot product). That angle is almost exactly 45 degrees: $\theta = 45.000^\circ \pm 0.001^\circ .$

When the formula is assumed to hold exactly (Q = 2/3), it may be used to predict the tau mass from the (more precisely known) electron and muon masses; that prediction is m_{τ} = 1776.969 MeV/c^{2}.

While the original formula arose in the context of preon models, other ways have been found to derive it (both by Sumino and by Koide – see references below). As a whole, however, understanding remains incomplete. Similar matches have been found for triplets of quarks depending on running masses. With alternating quarks, chaining Koide equations for consecutive triplets, it is possible to reach a result of 173.263947(6) GeV/c^{2} for the mass of the top quark.

== Mathematical properties ==
=== Allowed range ===
Considering any three positive real numbers we have

$$\frac{1}{3} < Q = \frac{x_1 + x_2 + x_3}{\left( \sqrt{ x_1 } + \sqrt{ x_2 } + \sqrt{ x_3 } \right)^2} < 1 ,$$

The upper bound follows from the fact that the square roots are necessarily positive, and the lower bound follows from the Cauchy–Bunyakovsky–Schwarz inequality. The Koide value, 2 / 3 , lies at the center of the mathematically allowed range. But note that removing the requirement of positive roots, it is possible to fit an extra tuple in the quark sector (the one with strange, charm and bottom).

=== Permutation symmetry ===
The Koide relation exhibits permutation symmetry among the three charged lepton masses $m_\text{e}$, $m_\mu$, and $m_\tau$. This means that the value of $Q$ remains unchanged under any interchange of these masses. Since the relation depends on the sum of the masses and the sum of their square roots, any permutation of $m_\text{e}$, $m_\mu$, and $m_\tau$ leaves $Q$ invariant:
$$Q = \frac{m_\text{e} + m_\mu + m_\tau}{\left( \sqrt{m_\text{e}} + \sqrt{m_\mu} + \sqrt{m_\tau} \right)^2} = \frac{m_{\sigma(\text{e})} + m_{\sigma(\mu)} + m_{\sigma(\tau)}}{\left( \sqrt{m_{\sigma(\text{e})}} + \sqrt{m_{\sigma(\mu)}} + \sqrt{m_{\sigma(\tau)}} \right)^2}$$
for any permutation $\sigma$ of $\{ \text{e}, \mu, \tau \}$.

=== Scale invariance ===
The Koide relation is scale invariant; that is, multiplying each mass by a common constant $\lambda$ does not affect the value of $Q$. Let $m'_i = \lambda m_i$ for $i = \text{e}, \mu, \tau$. Then:
$$\begin{align}
Q' &= \frac{m'_\text{e} + m'_\mu + m'_\tau}{\left( \sqrt{m'_\text{e}} + \sqrt{m'_\mu} + \sqrt{m'_\tau} \right)^2}
= \frac{\lambda m_\text{e} + \lambda m_\mu + \lambda m_\tau}{\left( \sqrt{\lambda m_\text{e}} + \sqrt{\lambda m_\mu} + \sqrt{\lambda m_\tau} \right)^2}
= \frac{m_\text{e} + m_\mu + m_\tau}{\left( \sqrt{m_\text{e}} + \sqrt{m_\mu} + \sqrt{m_\tau} \right)^2} = Q
\end{align}$$

Therefore, $Q$ remains unchanged under scaling of the masses by a common factor.

== Origins ==
The original derivation postulates $m_{e_i} \propto (z_0 + z_i)^2$ with the conditions

$$z_1 + z_2 + z_3 = 0$$
$$\tfrac{ 1 }{ 3 } (z_1^2+z_2^2+z_3^2) = z_0^2$$

from which the formula follows. Besides, masses for neutrinos and down quarks were postulated to be proportional to $z_i^2$ while masses for up quarks were postulated to be $\propto ( z_0 + 2 z_i )^2 ~.$

The published model justifies the first condition as part of a symmetry breaking scheme, and the second one as a "flavor charge" for preons in the interaction that causes this symmetry breaking.

Note that in matrix form with $M = A\ A^\dagger$ and $A = Z_0 + Z$ the equations are simply $\operatorname{tr} Z = 0$ and $\operatorname{tr} Z_0^2 = \operatorname{tr} Z^2 .$

== Phase formulation ==
The formula reduces to only two parameters; it is common to use a scale parameter and a phase so that any three masses that match with koide formula can be expressed as

$\sqrt{\,m_n\;} = \mu \left[1 + \sqrt 2 \cos\left( \delta + \frac{\,2\pi\,}{3}\cdot n \right) \right] ~,~$ for n = 1, 2, 3

For a discussion of the phase, see Zenczykowski

== Similar formulae ==
There are similar formulae which relate other masses. Quark masses depend on the energy scale used to measure them, which makes an analysis more complicated.

Taking the heaviest three quarks, charm (1.275±0.03 GeV/c^{2}), bottom (4.180±0.04 GeV/c^{2}) and top (173.0±0.40 GeV/c^{2}), regardless of their uncertainties, one arrives at the value cited by F. G. Cao (2012):

$$Q_\text{heavy} = \frac{m_\text{c} + m_\text{b} + m_\text{t}}{\left(\sqrt{m_\text{c}} + \sqrt{m_\text{b}} + \sqrt{m_\text{t}}\right)^2} \approx 0.669 \approx \frac{2}{3}.$$

This was noticed by Rodejohann and Zhang in the preprint of their 2011 article, but the observation was removed in the published version, so the first published mention is in 2012 from Cao.

The relation

$$Q_\text{middle} = \frac{m_\text{s} + m_\text{c} + m_\text{b}}{\left(- \sqrt{m_\text{s}} + \sqrt{m_\text{c}} + \sqrt{m_\text{b}} \right)^2} \approx 0.675$$

is published as part of the analysis of Rivero, who notes (footnote 3 in the reference) that an increase of the value for charm mass makes both equations, heavy and middle, exact.

The masses of the lightest quarks, up (2.2±0.4 MeV/c^{2}), down (4.7±0.3 MeV/c^{2}), and strange (95.0±4.0 MeV/c^{2}), without using their experimental uncertainties, yield

$$Q_\text{light} = \frac{m_\text{u} + m_\text{d} + m_\text{s}}{\left(\sqrt{m_\text{u}} + \sqrt{m_\text{d}} + \sqrt{m_\text{s}}\right)^2} \approx 0.57,$$

a value also cited by Cao in the same article. An older article, H. Harari, et al., calculates theoretical values for up, down and strange quarks, coincidentally matching the later Koide formula, albeit with a massless up-quark.

$$Q_\text{light} = \frac{0 + m_\text{d} + m_\text{s}}{\left(\sqrt{0} + \sqrt{m_\text{d}} + \sqrt{m_\text{s}}\right)^2}$$

This could be considered the first appearance of a Koide-type formula in the literature.

The inverse relation $Q_\text{inverse} = \frac{1/m_\text{d} + 1/m_\text{s} + 1/m_\text{b}}{\left(\sqrt{1/m_\text{d}} + \sqrt{1/m_\text{s}} + \sqrt{1/m_\text{b}}\right)^2}$

happens to be exactly 2/3 at energies of 100 TeV, according, and it is always within one sigma of the exact fraction in all the renormalisation group running.

== Running of particle masses ==
In quantum field theory, quantities like coupling constant and mass "run" with the energy scale. That is, their value depends on the energy scale at which the observation occurs, in a way described by a renormalization group equation (RGE). One usually expects relationships between such quantities to be simple at high energies (where some symmetry is unbroken) but not at low energies, where the RG flow will have produced complicated deviations from the high-energy relation. The Koide relation is exact (within experimental error) for the pole masses, which are low-energy quantities defined at different energy scales. For this reason, many physicists regard the relation as "numerology".

However, the Japanese physicist Yukinari Sumino has proposed mechanisms to explain origins of the charged lepton spectrum as well as the Koide formula, e.g., by constructing an effective field theory with a new gauge symmetry that causes the pole masses to exactly satisfy the relation. Koide has published his opinions concerning Sumino's model. François Goffinet's doctoral thesis gives a discussion on pole masses and how the Koide formula can be reformulated to avoid using square roots for the masses.

== As solutions to a cubic equation ==
A cubic equation usually arises in symmetry breaking when solving for the Higgs vacuum, and is a natural object when considering three generations of particles. This involves finding the eigenvalues of a 3 × 3 mass matrix.

For this example, consider a characteristic polynomial

$4 m^3 - 24 n^2 m^2 + 9 n (n^3 - 4) m - 9$

with roots $m_j : j = 1, 2, 3 ,$ that must be real and positive.

To derive the Koide relation, let $m \equiv x^2$ and the resulting polynomial can be factored into

$$( 2 x^3 - 6 n x^2 + 3 n^2x - 3 )( 2 x^3 + 6 n x^2 + 3 n^2 x + 3 )$$

or

$$4 ( x^3 - 3 n x^2 + \tfrac{ 3 }{ 2 } n^2x - \tfrac{ 3 }{ 2 } )( x^3 + 3 n x^2 + \tfrac{ 3 }{ 2 } n^2 x + \tfrac{ 3 }{ 2 } )$$

The elementary symmetric polynomials of the roots must reproduce the corresponding coefficients from the polynomial that they solve, so $x_1 + x_2 + x_3 = \pm 3 n$ and $x_1 x_2 + x_2 x_3 + x_3 x_1 = + \tfrac{ 3 }{ 2 } n^2.$ Taking the ratio of these symmetric polynomials, but squaring the first so we divide out the unknown parameter $n ,$ we get a Koide-type formula: Regardless of the value of $n ,$ the solutions to the cubic equation for $x$ must satisfy

$$\frac{ 2 ( x_1 x_2 + x_2 x_3 + x_3 x_1) }{ ( x_1 + x_2 + x_3 )^2 } = \frac{ (3 n^2) }{ (\pm 3 n)^2 } = \frac{ 1 }{ 3 }$$

so

$$1 - \frac{ 2 x_1 x_2 + 2 x_2 x_3 + 2 x_3 x_1 }{ ( x_1 + x_2 + x_3 )^2 } = 1 - \frac{ 1 }{ 3 } = \frac{ 2 }{ 3 } .$$

and

$$1 - \frac{ 2 x_1 x_2 + 2 x_2 x_3 + 2 x_3 x_1 }{ ( x_1 + x_2 + x_3 )^2 } = \frac{ ( x_1 + x_2 + x_3 )^2 - 2 x_1 x_2 - 2 x_2 x_3 - 2 x_3 x_1 }{ ( x_1 + x_2 + x_3 )^2 } = \frac{ x_1^2 + x_2^2 + x_3^2 }{ ( x_1 + x_2 + x_3 )^2 } .$$

Converting back to $\sqrt{ m } = x$

$$\frac{ m_1 + m_2 + m_3 }{ \left( \sqrt{ m_1 } + \sqrt{ m_2 } + \sqrt{ m_3 } \right)^2 } = \frac{ 2 }{ 3 } .$$

For the relativistic case, Goffinet's dissertation presented a similar method to build a polynomial with only even powers of $m .$

== Higgs mechanism ==
Koide proposed that an explanation for the formula could be a Higgs particle with $\mathrm{U}(3)$ flavour charge $\Phi^{a\overline{b}}$ given by:

$$V(\Phi) = \left[ 2\ \left[tr(\Phi)\right]^2 - 3\ tr(\Phi^2) \right]^2$$

with the charged lepton mass terms given by $\overline{\psi} \Phi^2 \psi .$ Such a potential is minimised when the masses fit the Koide formula. Minimising does not give the mass scale, which would have to be given by additional terms of the potential, so the Koide formula might indicate existence of additional scalar particles beyond the Standard Model's Higgs boson.

In fact one such Higgs potential would be precisely $V(\Phi) = \det[(\Phi-\sqrt{m_\text{e}})]^2 + \det[(\Phi-\sqrt{m_\mu})]^2 + \det[(\Phi-\sqrt{m_\tau})]^2$ which when expanded out the determinant in terms of traces would simplify using the Koide relations.

== See also ==
- Anomalous magnetic dipole moment
- CKM matrix
- Clifford algebra
- Generation
- Higgs mechanism
- Alternatives to the Standard Higgs Model
- PMNS matrix
- Quark–lepton complementarity
- Seesaw mechanism
- Technicolor
