= Lepton =

Class of elementary particles

- Leptons are involved in several processes such as beta decay.
- Composition: Elementary particle
- Statistics: Fermionic
- Generation: 1st, 2nd, 3rd
- Interactions: Electromagnetism, gravitation, weak
- Symbol: ℓ
- Antiparticle: Antilepton (ℓ̅)
- Types: 6 (electron, electron neutrino, muon, muon neutrino, tau, tau neutrino)
- Electric charge: +1 e, 0 e, −1 e
- Color charge: No
- Spin: 1/2 ħ
- Baryon number: 0

Generations of matter
Fermion categories		Elementary particle generation		
Type	Subtype	First	Second	Third
Quarks (colored)	down-type	down	strange	bottom
Quarks (colored)	up-type	up	charm	top
Leptons (color-free)	charged	electron	muon	tau
Leptons (color-free)	neutral	electron neutrino	muon neutrino	tau neutrino

In particle physics, a lepton is an elementary particle of half-integer spin (spin 1/2) that does not undergo strong interactions. Two main classes of leptons exist: charged leptons (also known as the electron-like leptons or muons), including the electron, muon, and tauon, and neutral leptons, better known as neutrinos. Charged leptons can combine with other particles to form various composite particles such as atoms and positronium, while neutrinos rarely interact with anything, and are consequently rarely observed. The best known of all leptons is the electron.

There are six types of leptons, known as flavours, grouped in three generations. The first-generation leptons, also called electronic leptons, comprise the electron (e^{−}) and the electron neutrino (ν_{e}); the second are the muonic leptons, comprising the muon (μ^{−}) and the muon neutrino (ν_{μ}); and the third are the tauonic leptons, comprising the tau (τ^{−}) and the tau neutrino (ν_{τ}). Electrons have the least mass of all the charged leptons. The heavier muons and taus will rapidly change into electrons and neutrinos through a process of particle decay: the transformation from a higher mass state to a lower mass state. Thus electrons are stable and the most common charged lepton in the universe, whereas muons and taus can only be produced in high-energy collisions (such as those involving cosmic rays and those carried out in particle accelerators).

Leptons have various intrinsic properties, including electric charge, spin, and mass. Unlike quarks, however, leptons are not subject to the strong interaction, but they are subject to the other three fundamental interactions: gravitation, the weak interaction, and to electromagnetism, of which the latter is proportional to charge, and is thus zero for the electrically neutral neutrinos.

For every lepton flavor, there is a corresponding type of antiparticle, known as an antilepton, that differs from the lepton only in that some of its properties have equal magnitude but opposite sign. According to certain theories, neutrinos may be their own antiparticle. It is not currently known whether this is the case.

The first charged lepton, the electron, was theorized in the mid-19th century by several scientists and was discovered in 1897 by J. J. Thomson. The next lepton to be observed was the muon, discovered by Carl D. Anderson in 1936, which was classified as a meson at the time. After investigation, it was realized that the muon did not have the expected properties of a meson, but rather behaved like an electron, only with higher mass. It took until 1947 for the concept of "leptons" as a family of particles to be proposed. The first neutrino, the electron neutrino, was proposed by Wolfgang Pauli in 1930 to explain certain characteristics of beta decay. It was first observed in the Cowan–Reines neutrino experiment conducted by Clyde Cowan and Frederick Reines in 1956. The muon neutrino was discovered in 1962 by Leon M. Lederman, Melvin Schwartz, and Jack Steinberger, and the tau discovered between 1974 and 1977 by Martin Lewis Perl and his colleagues from the Stanford Linear Accelerator Center and Lawrence Berkeley National Laboratory. The tau neutrino remained elusive until July 2000, when the DONUT collaboration from Fermilab announced its discovery.

Leptons are an important part of the Standard Model. Electrons are one of the components of atoms, alongside protons and neutrons. Exotic atoms with muons and taus instead of electrons can also be synthesized, as well as lepton–antilepton particles such as positronium.

== Etymology ==
The name lepton comes from the Greek λεπτός leptós, "fine, small, thin" (neuter nominative/accusative singular form: λεπτόν leptón); the earliest attested form of the word is the Mycenaean Greek 𐀩𐀡𐀵, re-po-to, written in Linear B syllabic script. Lepton was first used by physicist Léon Rosenfeld in 1948:

Following a suggestion of Prof. C. Møller, I adopt—as a pendant to "nucleon"—the denomination "lepton" (from λεπτός, small, thin, delicate) to denote a particle of small mass.

Rosenfeld chose the name as the common name for electrons and (then hypothesized) neutrinos. Additionally, the muon, initially classified as a meson, was reclassified as a lepton in the 1950s. The masses of those particles are small compared to nucleons—the mass of an electron (0.511 MeV/c^{2}) and the mass of a muon (with a value of 105.7 MeV/c^{2}) are fractions of the mass of the "heavy" proton (938.3 MeV/c^{2}), and the mass of a neutrino is nearly zero. However, the mass of the tau (discovered in the mid-1970s) (1777 MeV/c^{2}) is nearly twice that of the proton and 3477 times that of the electron.

== History ==
A muon transmutes into a muon neutrino by emitting a W^{−} boson. The W^{−} boson subsequently decays into an electron and an electron antineutrino.

Lepton nomenclature
Particle name	Antiparticle name
electron	antielectron positron
electron neutrino	electron antineutrino
muon mu lepton mu	antimuon antimu lepton antimu
muon neutrino muonic neutrino mu neutrino	muon antineutrino muonic antineutrino mu antineutrino
tauon tau lepton tau	antitauon antitau lepton antitau
tauon neutrino tauonic neutrino tau neutrino	tauon antineutrino tauonic antineutrino tau antineutrino

The first lepton identified was the electron, discovered by J.J. Thomson and his team of British physicists in 1897. Then in 1930, Wolfgang Pauli postulated the electron neutrino to preserve conservation of energy, conservation of momentum, and conservation of angular momentum in beta decay. Pauli theorized that an undetected particle was carrying away the difference between the energy, momentum, and angular momentum of the initial and observed final particles. The electron neutrino was simply called the neutrino, as it was not yet known that neutrinos came in different flavours (or different "generations").

Nearly 40 years after the discovery of the electron, the muon was discovered by Carl D. Anderson in 1936. Due to its mass, it was initially categorized as a meson rather than a lepton. It later became clear that the muon was much more similar to the electron than to mesons, as muons do not undergo the strong interaction, and thus the muon was reclassified: electrons, muons, and the (electron) neutrino were grouped into a new group of particles—the leptons. In 1962, Leon M. Lederman, Melvin Schwartz, and Jack Steinberger showed that more than one type of neutrino exists by first detecting interactions of the muon neutrino, which earned them the 1988 Nobel Prize, although by then the different flavours of neutrino had already been theorized.

The tau was first detected in a series of experiments between 1974 and 1977 by Martin Lewis Perl with his colleagues at the SLAC LBL group. Like the electron and the muon, it too was expected to have an associated neutrino. The first evidence for tau neutrinos came from the observation of "missing" energy and momentum in tau decay, analogous to the "missing" energy and momentum in beta decay leading to the discovery of the electron neutrino. The first detection of tau neutrino interactions was announced in 2000 by the DONUT collaboration at Fermilab, making it the second-to-latest particle of the Standard Model to have been directly observed, with Higgs boson being discovered in 2012.

Although all present data is consistent with three generations of leptons, some particle physicists are searching for a fourth generation. The current lower limit on the mass of such a fourth charged lepton is 100.8 GeV/c^{2}, while its associated neutrino would have a mass of at least 45.0 GeV/c^{2}.

== Properties ==
=== Spin and chirality ===
Left-handed and right-handed helicities

Leptons are spin 1/2 particles. The spin-statistics theorem thus implies that they are fermions and thus that they are subject to the Pauli exclusion principle: no two leptons of the same species can be in the same state at the same time. Furthermore, it means that a lepton can have only two possible spin states, namely up or down.

A closely related property is chirality, which in turn is closely related to a more easily visualized property called helicity. The helicity of a particle is the direction of its spin relative to its momentum; particles with spin in the same direction as their momentum are called right-handed and they are otherwise called left-handed. When a particle is massless, the direction of its momentum relative to its spin is the same in every reference frame, whereas for massive particles it is possible to 'overtake' the particle by choosing a faster-moving reference frame; in the faster frame, the helicity is reversed. Chirality is a technical property, defined through transformation behaviour under the Poincaré group, that does not change with reference frame. It is contrived to agree with helicity for massless particles, and is still well defined for particles with mass.

In many quantum field theories, such as quantum electrodynamics and quantum chromodynamics, left- and right-handed fermions are identical. However, the Standard Model's weak interaction treats left-handed and right-handed fermions differently: only left-handed fermions (and right-handed anti-fermions) participate in the weak interaction. This is an example of parity violation explicitly written into the model. In the literature, left-handed fields are often denoted by a capital L subscript (e.g. the normal electron e^{−}_{L}) and right-handed fields are denoted by a capital R subscript (e.g. a positron e^{+}_{R}).

Right-handed neutrinos and left-handed anti-neutrinos have no possible interaction with other particles (see Sterile neutrino) and so are not a functional part of the Standard Model, although their exclusion is not a strict requirement; they are sometimes listed in particle tables to emphasize that they would have no active role if included in the model. Even though electrically charged right-handed particles (electron, muon, or tau) do not engage in the weak interaction specifically, they can still interact electrically, and hence still participate in the combined electroweak force, although with different strengths (Y_{W}).

=== Electromagnetic interaction ===
Lepton–photon interaction

One of the most prominent properties of leptons is their electric charge, Q. The electric charge determines the strength of their electromagnetic interactions. It determines the strength of the electric field generated by the particle (see Coulomb's law) and how strongly the particle reacts to an external electric or magnetic field (see Lorentz force). Each generation contains one lepton with Q = −1 e and one lepton with zero electric charge. The lepton with electric charge is commonly simply referred to as a charged lepton while a neutral lepton is called a neutrino. For example, the first generation consists of the electron e^{−} with a negative electric charge and the electrically neutral electron neutrino ν_{e}.

In the language of quantum field theory, the electromagnetic interaction of the charged leptons is expressed by the fact that the particles interact with the quantum of the electromagnetic field, the photon. The Feynman diagram of the electron–photon interaction is shown on the right.

Because leptons possess an intrinsic rotation in the form of their spin, charged leptons generate a magnetic field. The size of their magnetic dipole moment μ is given by

$$\mu = g\, \frac{\; Q \hbar \;}{4 m} \ ,$$

where m is the mass of the lepton and g is the so-called "g factor" for the lepton. First-order quantum mechanical approximation predicts that the magnitude of the g factor is 2 for all leptons. However, higher-order quantum effects caused by loops in Feynman diagrams introduce corrections to this value. These corrections, referred to as the anomalous magnetic dipole moment, are very sensitive to the details of a quantum field theory model, and thus provide the opportunity for precision tests of the Standard Model. The theoretical and measured values for the electron anomalous magnetic dipole moment are within agreement within eight significant figures. The results for the muon, however, are problematic, hinting at a small, persistent discrepancy between the Standard Model and experiment.

=== Weak interaction ===
The weak interactions of the first generation leptons.

In the Standard Model, the left-handed charged lepton and the left-handed neutrino are arranged in doublet that transforms in the spinor representation (T = 1 /2) of the weak isospin SU(2) gauge symmetry. This means that these particles are eigenstates of the isospin projection T_{3} with eigenvalues + 1 /2 and − 1 /2 respectively. In the meantime, the right-handed charged lepton transforms as a weak isospin scalar (T = 0) and thus does not participate in the weak interaction, while there is no evidence that a right-handed neutrino exists at all.

The Higgs mechanism recombines the gauge fields of the weak isospin SU(2) and the weak hypercharge U(1) symmetries to three massive vector bosons (W^{+}, W^{−}, Z^{0}) mediating the weak interaction, and one massless vector boson, the photon (γ), responsible for the electromagnetic interaction. The electric charge Q can be calculated from the isospin projection T_{3} and weak hypercharge Y_{W} through the Gell-Mann–Nishijima formula,

Q = T_{3} + 1 /2 Y_{W}.

To recover the observed electric charges for all particles, the left-handed weak isospin doublet (ν_{eL}, e^{−}_{L}) must thus have Y_{W} = −1, while the right-handed isospin scalar e^{−}_{R} must have Y_{W} = −2. The interaction of the leptons with the massive weak interaction vector bosons is shown in the figure on the right.

=== Mass ===
In the Standard Model, each lepton starts out with no intrinsic mass. The charged leptons (i.e. the electron, muon, and tau) obtain an effective mass through interaction with the Higgs field, but the neutrinos remain massless. For technical reasons, the masslessness of the neutrinos implies that there is no mixing of the different generations of charged leptons as there is for quarks. The zero mass of neutrino is in close agreement with current direct experimental observations of the mass.

However, it is known from indirect experiments—most prominently from observed neutrino oscillations—that neutrinos have to have a nonzero mass, probably less than 2 eV/c^{2}. This implies the existence of physics beyond the Standard Model. The currently most favoured extension is the so-called seesaw mechanism, which would explain both why the left-handed neutrinos are so light compared to the corresponding charged leptons, and why we have not yet seen any right-handed neutrinos.

=== Lepton flavor quantum numbers ===
The members of each generation's weak isospin doublet are assigned leptonic numbers that are conserved under the Standard Model. Electrons and electron neutrinos have an electronic number of L_{e} = 1, while muons and muon neutrinos have a muonic number of L_{μ} = 1, while tau particles and tau neutrinos have a tauonic number of L_{τ} = 1. The antileptons have their respective generation's leptonic numbers of −1.

Conservation of the leptonic numbers means that the number of leptons of the same type remains the same, when particles interact. This implies that leptons and antileptons must be created in pairs of a single generation. For example, the following processes are allowed under conservation of leptonic numbers:

Each generation forms a weak isospin doublet.

γ → e^{−} + e^{+},
Z^{0} → τ^{−} + τ^{+},

but none of these:

γ → e^{−} + μ^{+},
W^{−} → e^{−} + ν_{τ},
Z^{0} → μ^{−} + τ^{+}.

However, neutrino oscillations are known to violate the conservation of the individual leptonic numbers. Such a violation is considered to be smoking gun evidence for physics beyond the Standard Model. A much stronger conservation law is the conservation of the total number of leptons (L with no subscript), conserved even in the case of neutrino oscillations, but even it is still violated a tiny amount by the chiral anomaly.

== Universality ==
The coupling of leptons to all types of gauge boson are flavour-independent: The interaction between leptons and a gauge boson measures the same for each lepton. This property is called lepton universality and has been tested in measurements of the muon and tau lifetimes and of Z boson partial decay widths, particularly at the Stanford Linear Collider (SLC) and Large Electron–Positron Collider (LEP) experiments.

The decay rate ($\Gamma$) of muons through the process μ^{−} → e^{−} + ν̅_{e} + ν_{μ} is approximately given by an expression of the form (see muon decay for more details)

$$\Gamma \left ( \mu^- \rarr e^- + \bar{\nu_e} +\nu_\mu \right ) \approx K_2\,  G_\text{F}^2\,  m_\mu^5 ~,$$

where K_{2} is some constant, and G_{F} is the Fermi coupling constant. The decay rate of tau particles through the process τ^{−} → e^{−} + ν̅_{e} + ν_{τ} is given by an expression of the same form

$$\Gamma \left ( \tau^- \rarr e^- + \bar{\nu_e} +\nu_\tau \right ) \approx K_3\, G_\text{F}^2\, m_\tau^5 ~,$$

where K_{3} is some other constant. Muon–tauon universality implies that K_{2} ≈ K_{3}. On the other hand, electron–muon universality implies

$$0.9726 \times \Gamma \left( \tau^- \rarr e^- + \bar{\nu_e} +\nu_\tau \right) = \Gamma \left( \tau^- \rarr \mu^- + \bar{\nu_\mu} +\nu_\tau \right) ~.$$

The branching ratios for the electronic mode (17.82%) and muonic (17.39%) mode of tau decay are not equal due to the mass difference of the final state leptons.

Universality also accounts for the ratio of muon and tau lifetimes. The lifetime $\Tau_\ell$ of a lepton $\ell$ (with $\ell$ = "μ" or "τ") is related to the decay rate by

$$\Tau_\ell = \frac{\; \mathcal{B} \left( \ell^- \rarr e^- + \bar{\nu_e} +\nu_\ell \right) \; }{ \Gamma \left( \ell^- \rarr e^- + \bar{\nu_e} +\nu_\ell \right)}\,$$,

where $\; \mathcal{B} (x \rarr y) \;$ denotes the branching ratios and $\;\Gamma(x \rarr y) \;$ denotes the resonance width of the process $\; x \rarr y ~,$ with x and y replaced by two different particles from "e" or "μ" or "τ".

The ratio of tau and muon lifetime is thus given by

$$\frac{\, \Tau_\tau \,}{\Tau_\mu} = \frac{\; \mathcal{B} \left( \tau^- \rarr e^- + \bar{\nu_e} +\nu_\tau \right) \;}{ \mathcal{B} \left( \mu^- \rarr e^- + \bar{\nu_e} +\nu_\mu \right) }\, \left(\frac{m_\mu}{m_\tau}\right)^5 ~.$$

Using values from the 2008 Review of Particle Physics for the branching ratios of the muon and tau yields a lifetime ratio of ~ 1.29×10^{−7}, comparable to the measured lifetime ratio of ~ 1.32×10^{−7}. The difference is due to K_{2} and K_{3} not actually being constants: They depend slightly on the mass of leptons involved.

Recent tests of lepton universality in B meson decays, performed by the LHCb, BaBar, and Belle experiments, have shown consistent deviations from the Standard Model predictions. However the combined statistical and systematic significance is not yet high enough to claim an observation of new physics.

In July 2021 results on lepton flavour universality have been published testing W decays, previous measurements by the LEP had given a slight imbalance but the new measurement by the ATLAS collaboration have twice the precision and give a ratio of $R_W^{\tau/\mu}=\mathcal{B} (W\rarr \tau\nu_\tau)/\mathcal{B}( W\rarr \mu\nu_\mu)=0.992\pm0.013$, which agrees with the standard-model prediction of unity. In 2024 a preprint by the ATLAS collaboration has published a new value of $R_W^{\mu/e}=\mathcal{B} (W\rarr \mu\nu_\mu)/\mathcal{B}( W\rarr e\nu_e)=0.9995\pm0.0045$ the most precise ratio so far testing the lepton flavour universality.

== Table of leptons ==
Properties of leptons
Spin J [ħ]	Particle or antiparticle name	Symbol	Charge Q [e]	Lepton flavor number			Mass [MeV/c^{2}]	Lifetime [s]
Spin J [ħ]	Particle or antiparticle name	Symbol	Charge Q [e]	L_{e}	L_{μ}	L_{τ}	Mass [MeV/c^{2}]	Lifetime [s]
1/2	electron	e^{−}	−1	+1	0	0	0.510998910(13)	stable
1/2	positron	e^{+}	+1	−1	0	0	0.510998910(13)	stable
1/2	muon	μ^{−}	−1	0	+1	0	105.6583668(38)	2.197019(21)×10^{−6}
1/2	antimuon	μ^{+}	+1	0	−1	0	105.6583668(38)	2.197019(21)×10^{−6}
1/2	tau	τ^{−}	−1	0	0	+1	1776.84(17)	2.906(10)×10^{−13}
1/2	antitau	τ^{+}	+1	0	0	−1	1776.84(17)	2.906(10)×10^{−13}
1/2	electron neutrino	ν_{e}	0	+1	0	0	< 0.0000022	unknown
1/2	electron antineutrino	ν̅_{e}	0	−1	0	0	< 0.0000022	unknown
1/2	muon neutrino	ν_{μ}	0	0	+1	0	< 0.17	unknown
1/2	muon antineutrino	ν̅_{μ}	0	0	−1	0	< 0.17	unknown
1/2	tau neutrino	ν_{τ}	0	0	0	+1	< 15.5	unknown
1/2	tau antineutrino	ν̅_{τ}	0	0	0	−1	< 15.5	unknown

== See also ==
- Koide formula
- List of particles
- Preons – hypothetical particles that were once postulated to be subcomponents of quarks and leptons
