= Pontecorvo–Maki–Nakagawa–Sakata matrix =

Model of neutrino oscillation

In particle physics, the Pontecorvo–Maki–Nakagawa–Sakata (PMNS) matrix , Maki–Nakagawa–Sakata (MNS) matrix, lepton mixing matrix, or neutrino mixing matrix is a unitary (Note: Note however, that the PMNS matrix is not unitary in the seesaw model.) mixing matrix that contains information on the mismatch of quantum states of neutrinos when they propagate freely and when they take part in weak interactions. It is a model of neutrino oscillation. This matrix was introduced in 1962 by Ziro Maki, Masami Nakagawa, and Shoichi Sakata, to explain the neutrino oscillations predicted by Bruno Pontecorvo.

== PMNS matrix ==
The Standard Model of particle physics contains three generations or "flavors" of neutrinos, $\nu_\mathrm{e}$, $\nu_\mu$, and $\nu_\tau$, each labeled with a subscript showing the charged lepton that it partners with in the charged-current weak interaction. These three eigenstates of the weak interaction form a complete, orthonormal basis for the Standard Model neutrino. Similarly, one can construct an eigenbasis out of three neutrino states of definite mass, $\nu_1$, $\nu_2$, and $\nu_3$, which diagonalize the neutrino's free-particle Hamiltonian. Observations of neutrino oscillation established experimentally that for neutrinos, as for quarks, these two eigenbases are different – they are 'rotated' relative to each other.

Consequently, each flavor eigenstate can be written as a combination of mass eigenstates, called a "superposition", and vice versa. The PMNS matrix, with components $U_{\alpha\,i}$ corresponding to the amplitude of mass eigenstate $i =$ 1, 2, 3 in terms of flavor $\alpha =$ "e", "μ", "τ"; parameterizes the unitary transformation between the two bases:

$$\begin{bmatrix} ~ \nu_\mathrm{e} \\ ~ \nu_\mu \\ ~ \nu_\tau ~ \end{bmatrix}
= \begin{bmatrix} ~ U_{\mathrm{e} 1} ~ & ~ U_{\mathrm{e} 2} ~ & ~ U_{\mathrm{e} 3} \\ ~ U_{\mu 1} & ~ U_{\mu 2} ~ & ~ U_{\mu 3} \\ ~ U_{\tau 1} ~ & ~ U_{\tau 2} ~ & ~ U_{\tau 3} \end{bmatrix} \begin{bmatrix} ~ \nu_1 \\ ~ \nu_2 \\ ~ \nu_3 ~ \end{bmatrix} ~.$$

The vector on the left represents a generic neutrino expressed in the flavor-eigenstate basis, and on the right is the PMNS matrix multiplied by a vector representing that same neutrino in the mass-eigenstate basis. A neutrino of a given flavor $\alpha$ is thus a "blend" of neutrinos with distinct masses: If one could measure directly that neutrino's mass, it would be found to have mass $m_i$ with probability $\left\vert U_{\alpha\,i}\right\vert^2$.

The PMNS matrix for antineutrinos is identical to the matrix for neutrinos under CPT symmetry.

Due to the difficulties of detecting neutrinos, it is much more difficult to determine the individual coefficients than for the equivalent matrix for the quarks (the CKM matrix).

=== Assumptions ===
==== Standard Model ====
In the Standard Model, the PMNS matrix is unitary. This implies that the sum of the squares of the values in each row and in each column, which represent the probabilities of different possible events given the same starting point, add up to 100%.

In the simplest case, the Standard Model posits three generations of neutrinos with Dirac mass that oscillate between three neutrino mass eigenvalues, an assumption that is made when best fit values for its parameters are calculated.

==== Other models ====
In other models the PMNS matrix is not necessarily unitary, and additional parameters are necessary to describe all possible neutrino mixing parameters in other models of neutrino oscillation and mass generation, such as the see-saw model, and in general, in the case of neutrinos that have Majorana mass rather than Dirac mass.

There are also additional mass parameters and mixing angles in a simple extension of the PMNS matrix in which there are more than three flavors of neutrinos, regardless of the character of neutrino mass. As of July 2014, scientists studying neutrino oscillation are actively considering fits of the experimental neutrino oscillation data to an extended PMNS matrix with a fourth, light "sterile" neutrino and four mass eigenvalues, although the current experimental data tends to disfavor that possibility.

=== Parameterization ===
In general, there are nine degrees of freedom in any unitary three by three matrix. However, in the case of the PMNS matrix, five of those real parameters can be absorbed as phases of the lepton fields and thus the PMNS matrix can be fully described by four free parameters. The PMNS matrix is most commonly parameterized by three mixing angles ($\theta_{12}$, $\theta_{23}$, and $\theta_{13}$) and a single phase angle called $\delta_{\mathrm{CP}}$ related to charge–parity violations (i.e. differences in the rates of oscillation between two states with opposite starting points, which makes the order in time in which events take place necessary to predict their oscillation rates), in which case the matrix can be written as:

$$\begin{align} & \begin{bmatrix} 1 & 0 & 0 \\ 0 & c_{23} & s_{23} \\ 0 & -s_{23} & c_{23} \end{bmatrix}
\begin{bmatrix} c_{13} & 0 & s_{13}e^{-i\delta_\mathrm{CP}} \\ 0 & 1 & 0 \\ -s_{13}e^{i\delta_\mathrm{CP}} & 0 & c_{13} \end{bmatrix}
\begin{bmatrix} c_{12} & s_{12} & 0 \\ -s_{12} & c_{12} & 0 \\ 0 & 0 & 1 \end{bmatrix} \\
& = \begin{bmatrix} c_{12}c_{13} & s_{12} c_{13} & s_{13}e^{-i\delta_\mathrm{CP}} \\
-s_{12}c_{23} - c_{12}s_{23}s_{13}e^{i\delta_\mathrm{CP}} & c_{12}c_{23} - s_{12}s_{23}s_{13}e^{i\delta_\mathrm{CP}} & s_{23}c_{13}\\
s_{12}s_{23} - c_{12}c_{23}s_{13}e^{i\delta_\mathrm{CP}} & -c_{12}s_{23} - s_{12}c_{23}s_{13}e^{i\delta_\mathrm{CP}} & c_{23}c_{13} \end{bmatrix}, \end{align}$$

where $s_{ij}$ and $c_{ij}$ are used to denote $\sin\theta_{ij}$ and $\cos\theta_{ij}$ respectively. In the case of Majorana neutrinos, two extra complex phases are needed, as the phase of Majorana fields cannot be freely redefined due to the condition $\nu = \nu^c$. An infinite number of possible parameterizations exist; one other common example being the Wolfenstein parameterization.

The mixing angles have been measured by a variety of experiments (see neutrino mixing for a description). The CP-violating phase $\delta_\mathrm{CP}$ has not been measured directly, but estimates can be obtained by fits using the other measurements.

The absolute values of the elements of the PMNS matrix can be reconstructed from the neutrino mass matrix using an eigenvector-eigenvalue identity. The PMNS matrix admits an algebraic representation in terms of the neutrino mass matrix and its Frobenius covariant. The neutrino-related amplitudes can be expressed using either the mixing matrix or the mass matrix.

=== Experimentally measured parameter values ===
As of November 2022, the current best-fit values from Nu-FIT.org, from direct and indirect measurements, using normal ordering, are: For September 2024 data, see NuFIT6

$$\begin{align}
\theta_{12} & =  {33.41^\circ}^{+0.75^\circ}_{-0.72^\circ} \\
\theta_{23} & =  {49.1^\circ}^{+1.0^\circ}_{-1.3^\circ}\\
\theta_{13} & =  {8.54^\circ}^{+0.11^\circ}_{-0.12^\circ}  \\
\delta_{\textrm{CP}} & = {197^\circ}^{+42^\circ}_{-25^\circ} \\
\end{align}$$

As of November 2022, the 3 σ ranges (99.7% confidence) for the magnitudes of the elements of the matrix were:

$$|U| = \begin{bmatrix}
~ |U_{\mathrm{e} 1}|    ~ & |U_{\mathrm{e} 2}|    ~ & |U_{\mathrm{e} 3}|    \\
~ |U_{\mu 1}|  ~ & |U_{\mu 2}|  ~ & |U_{\mu 3}|  \\
~ |U_{\tau 1}| ~ & |U_{\tau 2}| ~ & |U_{\tau 3}|  ~
\end{bmatrix} = \left[\begin{array}{rrr}
~ 0.803 \sim 0.845 ~~ &  0.514 \sim 0.578 ~~ &  0.142 \sim 0.155 ~ \\
~ 0.233 \sim 0.505 ~~ &  0.460 \sim 0.693 ~~ &  0.630 \sim 0.779 ~ \\
~ 0.262 \sim 0.525 ~~ &  0.473 \sim 0.702 ~~ &  0.610 \sim 0.762 ~
\end{array}\right]$$

Notes regarding the best fit parameter values

- These best fit values imply that there is much more neutrino mixing than there is mixing between the quark flavors in the CKM matrix (in the CKM matrix, the corresponding mixing angles are $\theta_{12} =$ 13.04°±0.05° , $\theta_{23} =$ 2.38°±0.06°, $\theta_{13} =$ 0.201°±0.011° ).
- These values are inconsistent with tribimaximal neutrino mixing (i.e. $\theta_{12} \approx$ 35.3° , $\theta_{23} =$ 45° , $\theta_{13} =$ 0° ) at a statistical significance of more than five standard deviations. Tribimaximal neutrino mixing was a common assumption in theoretical physics papers analyzing neutrino oscillation before more precise measurements were available.
- The value of $\delta_{\textrm{CP} } =$ 197°+42°
  −25° is very difficult to measure, and is the object of ongoing research; however the current constraint 169° $\le \delta_{\textrm{CP} } \le$ 246° , closer to 180° and farther from 0° (or 360°), shows a clear bias towards charge-parity violation.

== See also ==
- Neutrino oscillation
- Koide formula
- Cabibbo–Kobayashi–Maskawa matrix
