= Index of physics articles (C) =

The index of physics articles is split into multiple pages due to its size.

To navigate by individual letter use the table of contents below.

== C ==
- C*-algebra
- C-ROT gate
- C-number
- C-symmetry
- C-theorem
- C. B. Collins
- C. Bruce Tarter
- C. Chapin Cutler
- C. E. Wynn-Williams
- C. F. Powell
- C. K. Raju
- C. N. Yang Institute for Theoretical Physics
- C. Peter Flynn
- C. R. Hagen
- C. T. K. Chari
- C. Thomas Elliott
- C. V. Boys
- C. V. Raman
- CACTUS
- CADPAC
- CANFLEX
- CAREM
- CASTEP
- CASTOR calorimeter
- CCR and CAR algebras
- CDHS experiment
- CEBAF On-line Data Acquisition
- CENBOL
- CERN
- CERN Axion Solar Telescope
- CERN Courier
- CERN Neutrinos to Gran Sasso
- CERN openlab
- CERN Program Library
- CFD-ACE+
- CFD-DEM model
- CFX
- CGNS
- CGh physics
- CHARMM
- CHICOS
- CHSH inequality
- CIDNP
- CKM Matrix
- CLAS detector
- CLD chromophore
- CLEO (particle detector)
- CLHEP
- CLIO
- CLOUD
- CMBFAST
- CMB cold spot
- CNDO/2
- CNO cycle
- COGEMA La Hague site
- COMPASS experiment
- CORSIKA
- CP-parity
- CPT symmetry
- CP violation
- CR-39
- CRAC-II
- CRC Handbook of Chemistry and Physics
- CROCUS
- CRYSIS
- CSA (database company)
- CTX (explosive-detection device)
- CUSB
- C band (IEEE)
- C band (infrared)
- C band (NATO)
- C parity
- Cabbibo angle
- Cabibbo–Kobayashi–Maskawa matrix
- Cactus Framework
- Cadabra (computer program)
- Cadarache
- Caesar Saloma
- Cahn–Hilliard equation
- Calabi flow
- Calabi–Yau four-fold
- Calabi–Yau manifold
- Calandria (disambiguation), three different kinds of physics equipment
- Calculating Space
- Caldeira-Leggett model
- Calefaction
- Callan–Symanzik equation
- Callendar–Van Dusen equation
- Calogero conjecture
- Caloric theory
- Calorie
- Calorimeter (particle physics)
- Calorimeter constant
- Calorimetry
- Caloron
- Calutron
- Calvin Souther Fuller
- Camassa–Holm equation
- Camber (aerodynamics)
- Camber thrust
- Cambridge Structural Database
- Cameron Wright (weapons scientist)
- Campbell diagram
- Canadian Association of Physicists
- Canadian Geophysical Union
- Canadian Journal of Physics
- Canadian Light Source
- Canadian Neutron Beam Centre
- Canadian Penning Trap Mass Spectrometer
- Canadian Synchrotron Radiation Facility
- Canard (aeronautics)
- Candoluminescence
- Canfranc Underground Laboratory
- Canonical commutation relation
- Canonical coordinates
- Canonical distribution
- Canonical ensemble
- Canonical probability distribution
- Canonical quantization
- Canonical quantum gravity
- Canonical transformation
- Capacitance
- Capacitance electroscope
- Capacitance voltage profiling
- Capacitively coupled plasma
- Capacitor analogy
- Capillary action
- Capillary length
- Capillary number
- Capillary pressure
- Capillary surface
- Capillary wave
- Capture orbit
- Carbon-13 NMR
- Carbon-burning process
- Carbon (journal)
- Carbon detonation
- Carbon dioxide laser
- Carbon nanotube
- Carbon nanotube quantum dot
- Cardinal point (optics)
- Carel S. Scholten
- Carey Foster
- Cargill Gilston Knott
- Carl-Gunne Fälthammar
- Carl-Gustaf Rossby
- Carl Anton Bjerknes
- Carl Auer von Welsbach
- Carl August von Steinheil
- Carl David Anderson
- Carl David Tolmé Runge
- Carl Eckart
- Carl Friedrich Gauss
- Carl Friedrich von Weizsäcker
- Carl H. Brans
- Carl Hermann
- Carl Hodges
- Carl Kellner (optician)
- Carl M. Bender
- Carl Nordling
- Carl Pulfrich
- Carl Ramsauer
- Carl Sagan
- Carl Størmer
- Carl Wieman
- Carl Wilhelm Oseen
- Carlo Alberto Castigliano
- Carlo Beenakker
- Carlo Marangoni
- Carlo Matteucci
- Carlo Rovelli
- Carlo Rubbia
- Carlos Chagas Filho
- Carlos E.M. Wagner
- Carlos Frenk
- Carlton M. Caves
- Carlton R. Pennypacker
- Carminati–McLenaghan invariants
- Carnot's theorem (thermodynamics)
- Carnot cycle
- Carnot heat engine
- Carolin Crawford
- Carolinium
- Carolyne M. Van Vliet
- Carreau fluid
- Carrier-to-noise ratio
- Carrier-to-receiver noise density
- Carrier generation and recombination
- Carroll's paradox
- Carroll Alley
- Cartan formalism (physics)
- Cartan–Karlhede algorithm
- Carter constant
- Cartoon physics
- Car–Parrinello method
- Car–Parrinello molecular dynamics
- Cascading gauge theory
- Casimir effect
- Casimir machine
- Caspar Isenkrahe
- Cassie's law
- Cassini's laws
- Cat state
- Catadioptric sensor
- Catapult effect
- Catastrophic optical damage
- Catherine Bréchignac
- Cathodoluminescence
- Cathodoluminescence microscope
- Catoptrics
- Cauchy's equation
- Cauchy horizon
- Cauchy number
- Cauchy surface
- Cauchy–Born rule
- Causal dynamical triangulation
- Causal patch
- Causal perturbation theory
- Causal sets
- Causal structure
- Causal system
- Causality
- Causality (physics)
- Causality conditions
- Caustic (optics)
- Cavallo's multiplier
- Cavendish Professor of Physics
- Cavendish experiment
- Cavitation
- Cavity method
- Cavity quantum electrodynamics
- Cavity resonator
- Cebeci–Smith model
- Cecil Howard Green
- Cecil Reginald Burch
- Cees Dekker
- Ceiling (aircraft)
- Ceiling level
- Celestial spheres
- Celor lens
- Centauro event
- Center-of-momentum frame
- Center for Integrated Plasma Studies
- Center for Nanoscale Materials
- Center frequency
- Center manifold
- Center of Applied Space Technology and Microgravity
- Center of mass
- Center of mass coordinates
- Center of momentum
- Center of percussion
- Center of pressure (fluid mechanics)
- Center vortex
- Centers of gravity in non-uniform fields
- Centimetre of water
- Central European Journal of Physics
- Central body
- Central charge
- Central field approximation
- Central force
- Central potential
- Centre for High Energy Physics (University of the Punjab)
- Centre for Quantum Technologies
- Centre for Underground Physics in Pyhäsalmi
- Centre line thrust
- Centrifugal compressor
- Centrifugal force
- Centrifugal force (rotating reference frame)
- Centrifugal pump
- Centrifuge
- Centripetal force
- Centro Brasileiro de Pesquisas Físicas
- Centrosymmetry
- Cepheid
- Cepheid variable
- Cepheid variables
- Cepheids
- Ceramic flux
- Ceramic petrography
- Ceramic petrology
- Chad Orzel
- Chain reaction
- Chalcogenide glass
- Chalk River Laboratories
- Chamberlin–Moulton planetesimal hypothesis
- Chameleon particle
- Champagne flow
- Chandra X-ray Observatory
- Chandrasekhar limit
- Chandre Dharma-wardana
- Change of decay rate
- Changes of the length of day
- Channel noise level
- Channelling (physics)
- Chan–Paton factor
- Chao Tang
- Chaos: Making a New Science
- Chaos (physics)
- Chaos in optical systems
- Chaos theory
- Chaotic Inflation theory
- Chaplygin gas
- Chapman function
- Chapman–Enskog theory
- Chapman–Jouguet condition
- Characteristic admittance
- Characteristic impedance
- Characteristic mode analysis
- Characteristic number (fluid dynamics)
- Characteristic state function
- Characteristic time
- Charge-exchange ionization
- Charge-induced voltage alteration
- Charge (physics)
- Charge carrier
- Charge carrier density
- Charge conservation
- Charge contrast imaging
- Charge density
- Charge invariance
- Charge ordering
- Charge qubit
- Charge radius
- Charge transfer insulators
- Charged black hole
- Charged current
- Charged particle
- Charged particle beam
- Chargino
- Charles's law
- Charles-Augustin de Coulomb
- Charles Archambeau
- Charles Bruce (physicist)
- Charles Cagniard de la Tour
- Charles Chree
- Charles Christian Lauritsen
- Charles Critchfield
- Charles Drummond Ellis
- Charles Fabry
- Charles Francis Richter
- Charles Frank (physicist)
- Charles Galton Darwin
- Charles Glover Barkla
- Charles Gorrie Wynne
- Charles Grafton Page
- Charles Greeley Abbot
- Charles Guillaume Alexandre Bourgeois
- Charles H. Henry
- Charles Haldat
- Charles Hard Townes
- Charles J. Joachain
- Charles K. Kao
- Charles Kittel
- Charles L. Bennett
- Charles M. Falco
- Charles M. Herzfeld
- Charles M. Newman
- Charles Panati
- Charles R. Bentley
- Charles R. Doering
- Charles S. Peskin
- Charles Soret
- Charles Tahan
- Charles Taylor (physicist)
- Charles Thomson Rees Wilson
- Charles Thorn
- Charles Tomlinson (scientist)
- Charles W. Misner
- Charles Wheatstone
- Charles Wylie
- Charles Édouard Guillaume
- Charlotte Froese Fischer
- Charlotte Riefenstahl
- Charm (quantum number)
- Charm quark
- Charmed Lambda baryon
- Charmed baryons
- Charmed eta meson
- Charmness
- Charpy impact test
- Chart datum
- Chartered Physicist
- Chasman–Green lattice
- Chaudhry Abdul Majeed
- Cheerios effect
- Cheick Modibo Diarra
- Chemi-ionization
- Chemical Physics Letters
- Chemical Vapor Deposition (journal)
- Chemical affinity
- Chemical beam epitaxy
- Chemical force microscopy
- Chemical ionization
- Chemical laser
- Chemical oxygen iodine laser
- Chemical physics
- Chemical potential
- Chemical shift
- Chemical thermodynamics
- Chemiluminescence
- Chen Jiaer
- Chen Ning Yang
- Chen Yung-Jui
- Cheng Chemin
- Cheng Kaijia
- Cherenkov Array at Themis
- Cherenkov detector
- Cherenkov radiation
- Chern–Simons theory
- Cherry A. Murray
- Chester Carlson
- Chetayev instability theorem
- Cheuk-Yin Wong
- Chi-Wang Shu
- Chi b (3P)
- Chia-Chiao Lin
- Chia-Hsiung Tze
- Chia-Shun Yih
- Chiang C. Mei
- Chiara Nappi
- Chicago Air Shower Array
- Chicago Pile-1
- Chien-Shiung Wu
- Chih-Kung Jen
- Child's law
- Chinese Journal of Physics
- Chinese Optics Letters
- Chip-scale atomic clock
- Chiral Potts curve
- Chiral anomaly
- Chiral color
- Chiral gauge theory
- Chiral model
- Chiral perturbation theory
- Chiral superfield
- Chiral symmetry
- Chiral symmetry breaking
- Chirality (electromagnetism)
- Chirality (physics)
- Chirped pulse amplification
- Chladni's law
- Chlorine-37
- Choke (electronics)
- Choked flow
- Chooz (experiment)
- Chord (aircraft)
- Chris Adami
- Chris Hull
- Chris J. L. Doran
- Chris Quigg
- Chris Sachrajda
- Chris Wallace (computer scientist)
- Christer Fuglesang
- Christiaan Huygens
- Christian August Hausen
- Christian Christiansen (physicist)
- Christian Doppler
- Christian Gerthsen
- Christian Heinrich Pfaff
- Christian Ludwig Gerling
- Christian Møller
- Christian T. Elvey
- Christian Wissel
- Christine Sutton
- Christoffel symbols
- Christofilos Effect
- Christoph Cremer
- Christoph Helmut Keitel
- Christoph Scheiner
- Christopher Aikman
- Christopher Bishop
- Christopher Hansteen
- Christopher Isham
- Christopher J. Hardy
- Christopher Jargocki
- Christopher Llewellyn Smith
- Christopher Polhem
- Christopher Stubbs
- Christopher T. Hill
- Christopher T. Russell
- Christopher Wren
- Chromatic aberration
- Chromatic dispersion
- Chromosphere
- Chromo–Weibel instability
- Chronology of the universe
- Chronology protection conjecture
- Chronon
- Chung-Yao Chao
- Churchill–Bernstein equation
- Chézy formula
- Circuit noise level
- Circuit quantum electrodynamics
- Circuit theory
- Circular dichroism
- Circular motion
- Circular orbit
- Circular polarization
- Circular polarization in nature
- Circular polarization of starlight
- Circulation (fluid dynamics)
- Circulation control wing
- Circumhorizontal arc
- Circumscribed halo
- Circumzenithal arc
- Claire F. Gmachl
- Clamper (electronics)
- Clapotis
- Clarence Allen (geologist)
- Clarence Zener
- Clarendon Laboratory
- Clarity meter
- Clark Blanchard Millikan
- Classical-map hypernetted-chain method
- Classical Cepheid
- Classical Cepheid variable
- Classical Cepheids
- Classical Heisenberg model
- Classical Mechanics (book)
- Classical XY model
- Classical and Quantum Gravity
- Classical central-force problem
- Classical electromagnetism
- Classical electromagnetism and special relativity
- Classical electron radius
- Classical field theory
- Classical limit
- Classical mechanics
- Classical optics
- Classical physics
- Classical scaling dimension
- Classical theories of gravitation
- Classical theory
- Classical thermodynamics
- Classical treatment of tensors
- Classical unified field theories
- Classification of electromagnetic fields
- Claud E. Cleeton
- Claude-Auguste Lamy
- Claude-Louis Navier
- Claude Cohen-Tannoudji
- Claude Pouillet
- Claude R. Canizares
- Claude Wendell Horton, Jr.
- Claude Wendell Horton, Sr.
- Claudia Alexander
- Claudio Bunster
- Clausius theorem
- Clausius–Clapeyron relation
- Clausius–Duhem inequality
- Clean And Environmentally Safe Advanced Reactor
- Clearing factor
- Clebsch–Gordan coefficients
- Clemens C. J. Roothaan
- Clemens Timpler
- Clement John Tranter
- Clifford Berry
- Clifford Martin Will
- Clifford Shull
- Clifford Truesdell
- Clifford Victor Johnson
- Clifford analysis
- Climate of Uranus
- Clinical biophysics
- Clint Sprott
- Clinton Davisson
- Cloaking device
- Cloaking device metamaterial
- Cloaking device metamaterials
- Cloaking devices metamaterial
- Cloaking devices metamaterials
- Cloaking metamaterial
- Cloaking metamaterials
- Clock hypothesis
- Clockwork universe theory
- Close coupling
- Close-packing of equal spheres
- Closed system
- Closed timelike curve
- Closed wing
- Cloud chamber
- Cloud condensation nuclei
- Cloud drop effective radius
- Clover (detector)
- Cluster (physics)
- Cluster decay
- Cluster decomposition theorem
- Clyde Cowan
- Clyde Wiegand
- Cnoidal wave
- Coandă effect
- Coaxial rotors
- Cobra probe
- Cockcroft Institute
- Cockcroft–Walton generator
- Code Saturne
- Code V
- Codex Arundel
- Coefficient of friction
- Coefficient of performance
- Coefficient of restitution
- Coefficient of thermal expansion
- Coefficients of potential
- Coercivity
- Coffee ring
- Coffin corner (aviation)
- Coherence (physics)
- Coherence length
- Coherence theory (optics)
- Coherence time
- Coherent backscattering
- Coherent control
- Coherent information
- Coherent perfect absorber
- Coherent potential approximation
- Coherent spectroscopy
- Coherent states
- Cohesion (chemistry)
- Coincidence circuit
- Coincidence rangefinder
- Cold
- Cold Big Bang
- Cold dark matter
- Cold fission
- Cold fusion
- Cold rubber
- Cold trap
- Cold trap (astronomy)
- Cold vapour atomic fluorescence spectroscopy
- Coleman–Mandula theorem
- Coleman–Weinberg potential
- Cole–Cole equation
- Colin Franklin (engineer)
- Colin Webb (physicist)
- Collective diffusion
- Collective dose
- Collective excitation
- Collective excitations
- Collider
- Collider Detector at Fermilab
- Colligative properties
- Collimated light
- Collimating lens
- Collimator
- Collision
- Collision-induced dissociation
- Collision cascade
- Collision detection
- Collision response
- Colloid
- Colloid and Polymer Science
- Colloid vibration current
- Color charge
- Color confinement
- Color glass condensate
- Color superconductivity
- Colored-particle-in-cell
- Colorimeter (chemistry)
- Colorimetry
- Colors of noise
- Color–color diagram
- Color–flavor locking
- Colossal magnetoresistance
- Columnar phase
- Coma (optics)
- Combination tone
- Combinatorics and physics
- Combined RF trap
- Combined gas law
- Combustibility
- Committed dose
- Committed dose equivalent
- Committed effective dose equivalent
- Committee on the Safety of Nuclear Installations
- Common beta emitters
- Communicating vessels
- Communication physics
- Communications in Mathematical Physics
- Commutator (electric)
- Comoving distance
- CompHEP
- Compact Linear Collider
- Compact Muon Solenoid
- Compact dimension
- Compact star
- Compactification (physics)
- Compaction simulation
- Comparison of software for molecular mechanics modeling
- Compatibility (mechanics)
- Complementarity (physics)
- Complementary experiments
- Complete set of commuting observables
- Complex beam parameter
- Complex circuit
- Complex dynamics
- Complex fluids
- Complex harmonic motion
- Complex lamellar vector field
- Component (thermodynamics)
- Composite fermion
- Composite field
- Composite gravity
- Composite particle
- Compressed fluid
- Compressed magnetic flux generator
- Compressibility
- Compressibility factor
- Compressible flow
- Compression (physical)
- Compression lift
- Compton Gamma Ray Observatory
- Compton scattering
- Compton wavelength
- Compton–Getting effect
- Computational Materials Science
- Computational Science & Discovery
- Computational aeroacoustics
- Computational chemical methods in solid-state physics
- Computational electromagnetics
- Computational fluid dynamics
- Computational geophysics
- Computational magnetohydrodynamics
- Computational physics
- Computed radiography
- Computed tomography laser mammography
- Computer Automated Measurement and Control
- Computer Physics Communications
- Comstock Prize in Physics
- Concentric tube heat exchanger
- Conceptual physics
- Concurrence (quantum computing)
- Concurrence principle
- Condensation
- Condensation (aerosol dynamics)
- Condensed Matter
- Condensed matter physics
- Conditional quantum entropy
- Conductance quantum
- Conduction band
- Conductive coupling
- Conductivity (electrolytic)
- Conductivity of transparency
- Conductor gallop
- Cone beam computed tomography
- Configuration interaction
- Configuration space
- Configuration state function
- Confocal microscopy
- Conformal anomaly
- Conformal cyclic cosmology
- Conformal family
- Conformal field theory
- Conformal gravity
- Conformal infinity
- Conformal supergravity
- Conformal symmetry
- Conformational entropy
- Congruence (general relativity)
- Conical pendulum
- Conifold
- Conjugate depth
- Conjugate variables
- Conjugate variables (thermodynamics)
- Conoscopy
- Conservation law
- Conservation of energy
- Conservation of mass
- Conservative force
- Conservative vector field
- Conserved current
- Conserved property
- Consistent histories
- Constant-energy surface
- Constant of motion
- Constantin Carathéodory
- Constantin Perskyi
- Constantin Senlecq
- Constantine Pozrikidis
- Constantino Tsallis
- Constituent quark
- Constituent quark mass
- Constitutive equation
- Constraint algebra
- Constructive quantum field theory
- Contact (mechanics)
- Contact angle
- Contact area
- Contact electrification
- Contact force
- Contact image sensor
- Contact mechanics
- Contact protection
- Contact resistance
- Contaminated Gaussian
- Contemporary Physics
- Contiguity
- Continuity equation
- Continuous wave
- Continuum mechanics
- Contorsion tensor
- Contour line
- Contributors to general relativity
- Contributors to the mathematical background for general relativity
- Control moment gyroscope
- Control rod
- Control volume
- Controlled NOT gate
- Controlled aerodynamic instability phenomena
- Convection
- Convection cell
- Convection heater
- Convection microwave
- Convection zone
- Convection–diffusion equation
- Convective available potential energy
- Convective inhibition
- Convective instability
- Convective mixing
- Convective overturn
- Conventional lens
- Conventional superconductor
- Conyers Herring
- Coolfluid
- Cooling curve
- Cooper electron pair
- Cooper pair
- Cooperstock's energy-localization hypothesis
- Coordinate-free
- Coordinate conditions
- Coordinate system
- Coordinate time
- Coordinated flight
- Coordination geometry
- Copenhagen (play)
- Copenhagen interpretation
- Copernican principle
- Copper indium gallium selenide solar cells
- Core-excited shape resonance
- Core/Shell Semiconductor Nanocrystals
- Core (optical fiber)
- Core electron
- Core–mantle boundary
- Coriolis effect
- Coriolis field
- Coriolis–Stokes force
- Corium (nuclear reactor)
- Cornelis Dirk Andriesse
- Cornelis Rudolphus Theodorus Krayenhoff
- Cornelius Denvir
- Cornelius Lanczos
- Cornell Electron Storage Ring
- Cornell Laboratory for Accelerator-based Sciences and Education
- Corner reflector
- Cornering force
- Corona
- Corona (optical phenomenon)
- Corona discharge
- Corona poling
- Coronal mass ejection
- Coronal radiative losses
- Coronal seismology
- Corpuscular theory of light
- Corrado Giannantoni
- Correlation dimension
- Correlation function (astronomy)
- Correlation function (quantum field theory)
- Correlation function (statistical mechanics)
- Correlation sum
- Correspondence principle
- Correspondence rules
- Coset conformal field theory
- Cosmas Zachos
- Cosmic-ray observatory
- Cosmic Anisotropy Polarization Mapper
- Cosmic Background Explorer
- Cosmic Background Imager
- Cosmic Research
- Cosmic censorship hypothesis
- Cosmic gravitational wave background
- Cosmic infrared background
- Cosmic microwave background radiation
- Cosmic neutrino background
- Cosmic noise
- Cosmic ray
- Cosmic ray spallation
- Cosmic ray visual phenomena
- Cosmic string
- Cosmic variance
- Cosmogenic nuclide
- Cosmogony
- Cosmological constant
- Cosmological decade
- Cosmological perturbation theory
- Cosmological principle
- Cosmology
- Cosmos
- Cosmotron
- Coster–Kronig transition
- Cotton effect
- Cotton tensor
- Cotton–Mouton effect
- Cottrell atmosphere
- Couette flow
- Coulomb
- Coulomb's law
- Coulomb barrier
- Coulomb blockade
- Coulomb collision
- Coulomb excitation
- Coulomb gap
- Coulomb potential
- Coulomb staircase
- Counter-electromotive force
- Counter-scanned images
- Counter-scanning
- Counterfactual definiteness
- Counting efficiency
- Counts per minute
- Couple (mechanics)
- Coupled-wave method
- Coupled cluster
- Coupling (physics)
- Coupling constant
- Coupling loss
- Coupling parameter
- Courant–Friedrichs–Lewy condition
- Course of Theoretical Physics
- Covariant Hamiltonian field theory
- Covariant classical field theory
- Covariant derivative
- Covariant formulation of classical electromagnetism
- Cowan–Reines neutrino experiment
- Crab cavity
- Craig Bohren
- Creation and annihilation operators
- Creation ex materia
- Creation ex nihilo
- Creeping wave
- Cremona diagram
- Crepuscular rays
- Crest (physics)
- Critical Mach number
- Critical Mass (book)
- Critical angle of attack
- Critical band
- Critical dimension
- Critical distance
- Critical exponent
- Critical field
- Critical heat flux
- Critical ionization velocity
- Critical line (thermodynamics)
- Critical opalescence
- Critical phenomena
- Critical point (thermodynamics)
- Critical radius
- Critical relative humidity
- Critical resolved shear stress
- Critical size
- Critical taper
- Critical temperature
- Critical variable
- Criticality accident
- Criticism of the theory of relativity
- Crivăţ
- Crookes radiometer
- Crooks fluctuation theorem
- Cross-phase modulation
- Cross-recurrence quantification
- Cross entropy
- Cross fluid
- Cross modulation
- Cross sea
- Cross section (physics)
- Crossing (physics)
- Crosswind
- Crow instability
- Crowbar (circuit)
- Crown glass (optics)
- CryoEDM
- Cryocooler
- Cryoelectronics
- Cryogenic Dark Matter Search
- Cryogenic Rare Event Search with Superconducting Thermometers
- Cryogenic particle detectors
- Cryogenic processor
- Cryogenic storage dewar
- Cryogenics
- Cryomodule
- Cryophorus
- Cryopump
- Cryoscopic constant
- Cryotronics
- Crypton (particle)
- Cryst. Growth Des.
- Cryst Growth Des
- Crystal
- Crystal (software)
- Crystal Ball (detector)
- Crystal Ball function
- Crystal Growth & Design
- Crystal growth
- Crystal model
- Crystal momentum
- Crystal monochromator
- Crystal optics
- Crystal oven
- Crystal structure
- Crystal structure of boron-rich metal borides
- Crystal structure prediction
- Crystal system
- Crystal twinning
- Crystalline
- Crystalline solid
- Crystallinity
- Crystallization
- Crystallographic database
- Crystallographic defect
- Crystallographic group
- Crystallographic point group
- Crystallographic restriction theorem
- Crystallography
- Crystallography and NMR system
- Crystalloluminescence
- Csaba Csáki
- Ctirad Uher
- Cu-Pt type ordering in III-V semiconductor
- Cubic crystal system
- Cubic metre
- Cumulative dose
- Cunningham correction factor
- Cuntz algebra
- Curie
- Curie's law
- Curie constant
- Curie temperature
- Curie–Weiss law
- Curl (mathematics)
- Current (stream)
- Current algebra
- Current density
- Current density (quantum mechanics)
- Current quark
- Current quark mass
- Current sheet
- Current sources and sinks
- Current superfield
- Curtis Callan
- Curtis J. Humphreys
- Curvature invariant
- Curvature invariant (general relativity)
- Curveball
- Curved mirror
- Curved spacetime
- Cuspy halo problem
- Custodial symmetry
- Cutoff (physics)
- Cutoff voltage
- Cycles of Time (book)
- Cyclic model
- Cyclone
- Cyclonic separation
- Cyclops laser
- Cyclotron
- Cyclotron radiation
- Cyclotron resonance
- Cylinder stresses
- Cylinderical cloak
- Cylindrical multipole moments
- Cymatics
- Cyril Domb
- Cyril Hilsum
- Cyril Isenberg
- Cyril Norman Hinshelwood
- Cyril Sinelnikov
- Czesław Białobrzeski
- Czochralski process
- César Lattes
