= CLD =

CLD may refer to:

== Medicine ==
- Cholesterol-lowering drug
- Chronic liver disease
- Chronic lung disease
- Chronic lifestyle disease

== Transport ==
- Chelsfield railway station in Orpington, London (National Rail station code: CLD)
- ChairLift Detachable, a classification of a Detachable chairlift
- McClellan–Palomar Airport in CarLsbaD, California (IATA Code: CLD)

== Science and technology ==
- Causal loop diagram for modeling dynamic systems
- The Center for Life Detection, a NASA-supported collaboration of researchers in the science of detecting life beyond the Earth
- The Commercial LEO Destinations program, a NASA project to support private businesses building in low Earth orbit
- Chaldean Neo-Aramaic (language), in ISO 639-3 code (list of all codes beginning with "c")
- cld, the clear direction flag instruction on x86 compatible CPUs, opposite of std
- CLD chromophore in organic chemistry and polymeric nonlinear optics
- CLD player, a series of Laserdisc players with CD playback from Pioneer
- Color layout descriptor, a summary used in digital image processing to capture the spatial distribution of color in an image
- Command Definition Language, for defining commands for use with DIGITAL Command Language
- Configurable logic device, synonym for programmable logic device (PLD)
- Constrained-layer damping, a mechanical engineering technique for suppression of vibration
- Current limiting diode, otherwise known as constant current diode in electronics

== Other ==
- Charles Lutwidge Dodgson, the real name of Lewis Carroll
- Christian Leroy Duncan, English professional mixed martial artist
