= Calandra =

Calandra may refer to:

== People ==
- Alexander Calandra (1911–2006), American physicist and educator
- Davide Calandra (1856–1915), Italian sculptor and cabinet maker
- Giovanni Battista Calandra (1586–c. 1644), Italian mosaic artist
- Giuliana Calandra (1936–2018), Italian actor and television journalist
- John D. Calandra (1928–1986), American lawyer and politician
- Paul Calandra (born 1970), Canadian politician
- Peter Calandra, American composer and pianist
- Saúl Calandra (1904–1973), Argentine footballer
- Thom Calandra (born 1956), American journalist and investor
- Tommy Calandra (1941-1998), American guitarist, songwriter, record producer
- Mauricio and Giuseppe Calandra, Italian musicians forming the duo Calandra & Calandra

== Other uses ==
- 8967 Calandra, a main belt asteroid
- Calandra (beetle), a genus of weevils
- Calandra lark, a bird

== See also ==
- Calandria (disambiguation)
- Calandro, comic opera
- Caloundra, urban area in Queensland, Australia
