= CRQ =

CRQ may refer to:

- Air Creebec, based in Quebec (ICAO designator)
- McClellan–Palomar Airport, California (FAA location identifier)
- :CRQ, a software product for CueCat
- Caravelas Airport, Bahia, Brazil (IATA code)
- Change request, in information technology, a customer or user's request to change hardware or software
- Cross-recurrence quantification, in signal processing
- Classical Recordings Quarterly, British magazine devoted to vintage recordings of classical music
- Cleeves Riverside Quarter, Limerick, Ireland, a property development
