= Matemateca =

Collection of mathematical tutorial objects

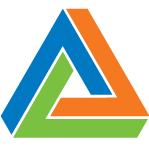
- Matemateca logo
- Housed at: Cidade Universitária, 1010 Rua do Matão, São Paulo, Brasil
- Funded by: Institute of Mathematics and Statistics, University of São Paulo (IME-USP)
- Website: http://matemateca.ime.usp.br

Matemateca (Matemateca IME-USP) is a collection of objects related to mathematics and mathematics teaching that is housed in the Institute of Mathematics and Statistics of the University of São Paulo. It is an initiative that dates to 2003, when professors connected to IME mobilized and counted with the support of Pró-Reitorias de Graduação e de Cultura e Extensão da Universidade de São Paulo and CNPQ (National Research Council) to organize the collection. Matemateca organizes exhibitions open to the public.

The professors in the Department of Mathematics of IME-USP (Institute of Mathematics and Statistics of the University of São Paulo) who initiated the project were Deborah Raphael, Eduardo Colli, and Sônia Garcia; Artur Simões Rozestraten from the Laboratory for Models and Tests (LAME) in the Department of Architectural Technology of the FAU-USP ( Faculty of Architecture and Urbanism of the University of São Paulo) partners with the IME.

== History ==
In August 2002 the French itinerant exhibition of the Cité des sciences et de I'industrie, visited IME, causing in some teachers the desire of building a collection with the purpose of divulging to students of the exact area mathematical contents that are not covered in graduation courses. Matemateca's debut took place during the First Week of Graduation of the Institute of Mathematics and Statistics of the University of São Paulo (IME). Then it was taken to Salvador, Bahia, in order to be exhibited in the II Bienal da Sociedade Brasileira de Matemática. A presentation in Rio de Janeiro, at the IV World Congress of Science Centers, in conjunction with the USP's Science Station, showed the organizers the potential of the collection for the general public, especially students of all levels. The project began to aim at the popularization of mathematics, giving preference to interactive objects that could be approached by means of direct challenges to the visitor. As a way to expand the field of access, Matemateca participated in an upload drive to Wikimedia Commons of some digital images belonging to the collection, under the free Creative Commons Attribution-Share Alike 4.0 International license.

== Collection ==
Matemateca's collection is divided in approximately forty different themes that include equations and functions among other mathematical and statistical concepts. The visitors, be them USP students, family members, teachers or students from other schools and colleges are granted full permission to handle all the exposed content, thus allowing and encouraging an interactive experiential learning. Some items can be seen below.

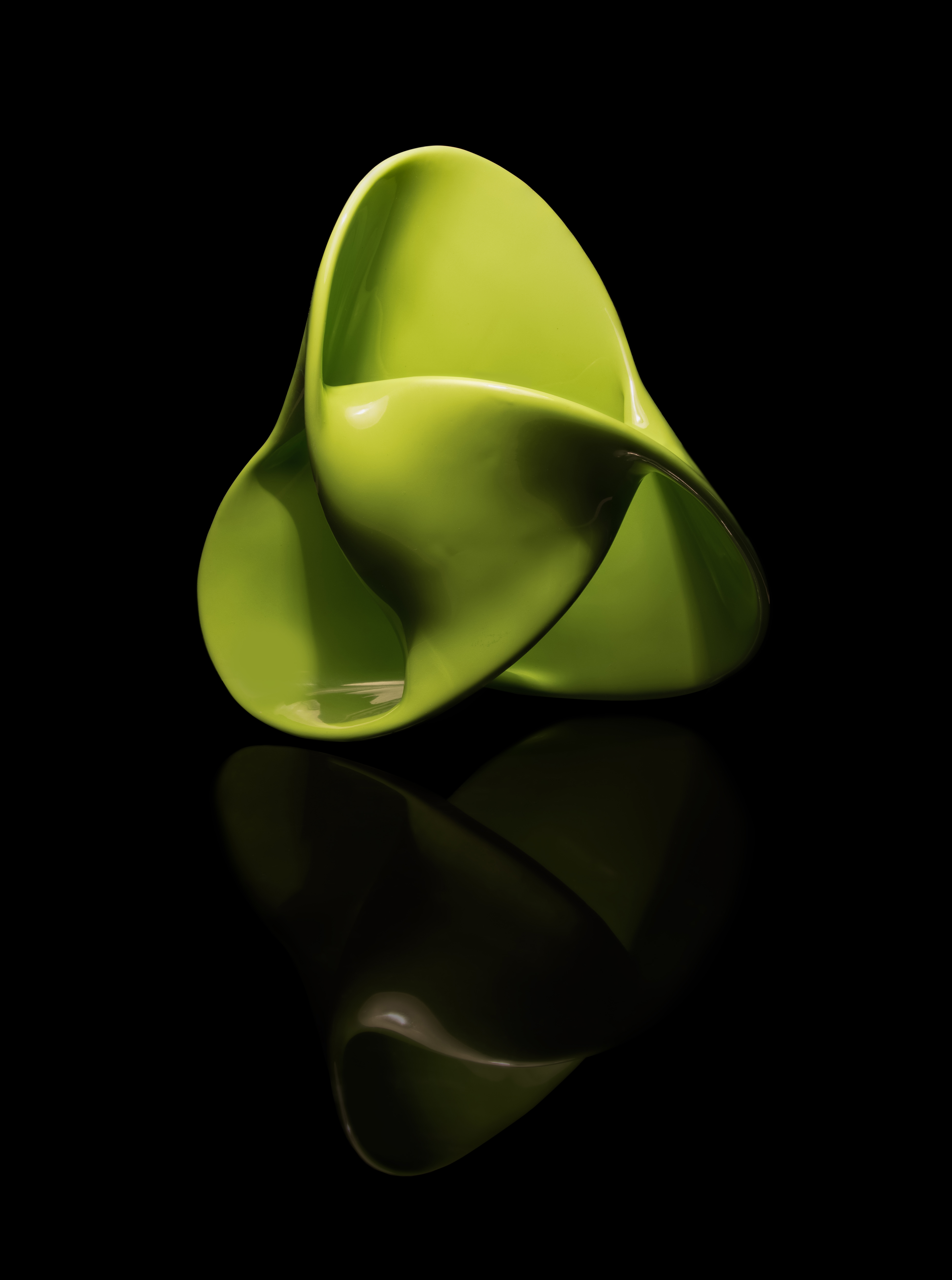
Surface topology.

Chladni's law

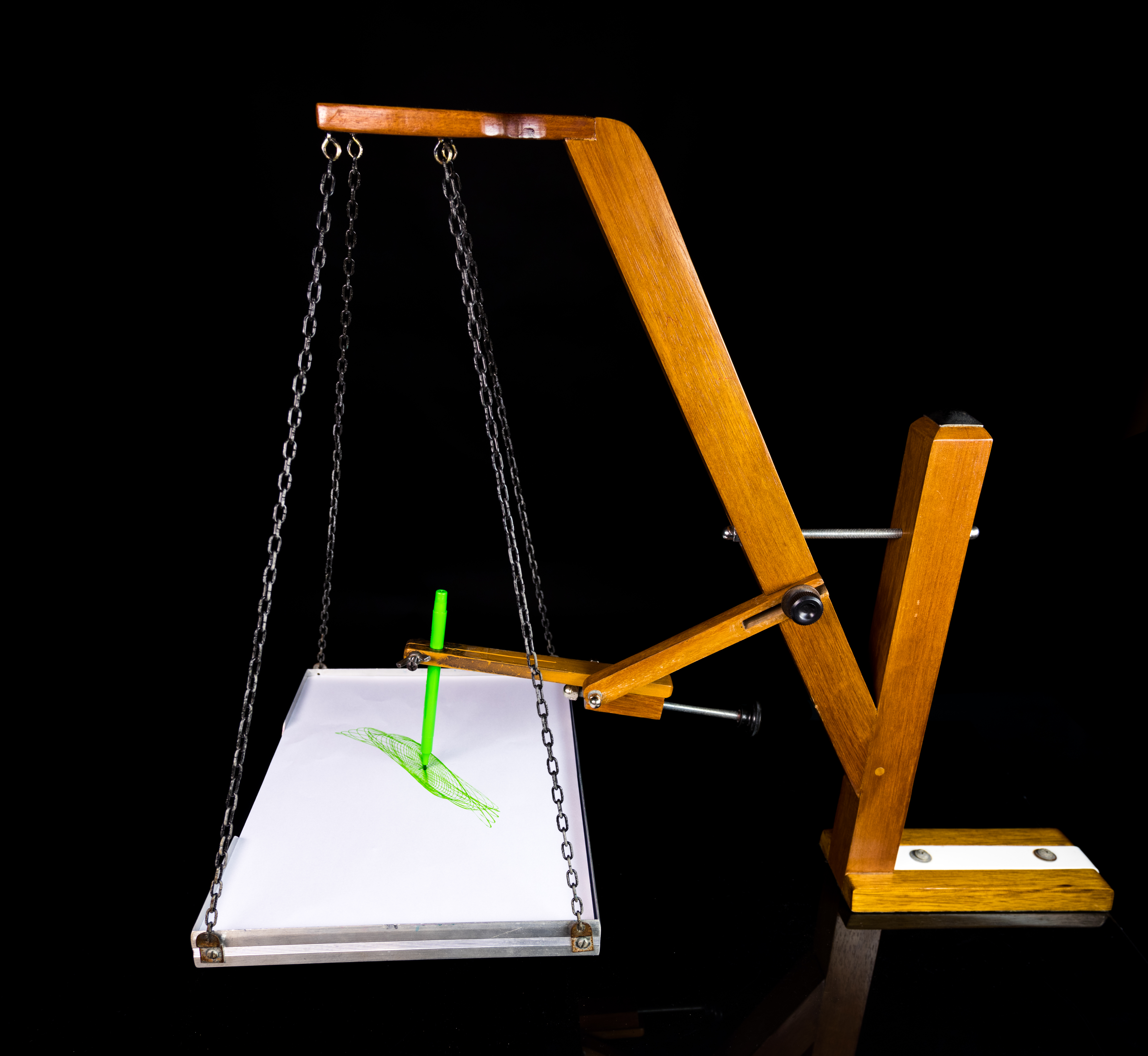
Balancette

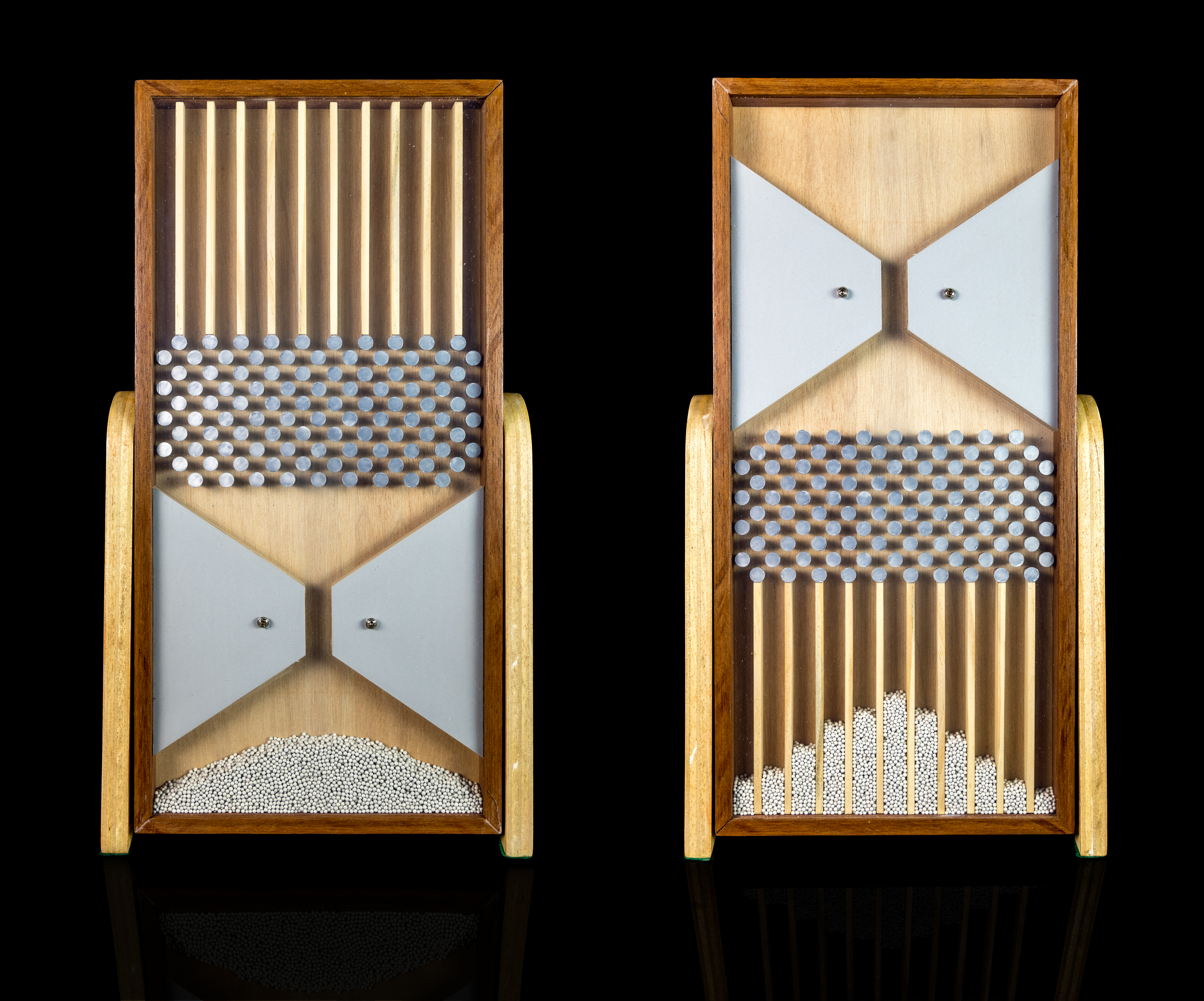
Galton tablets

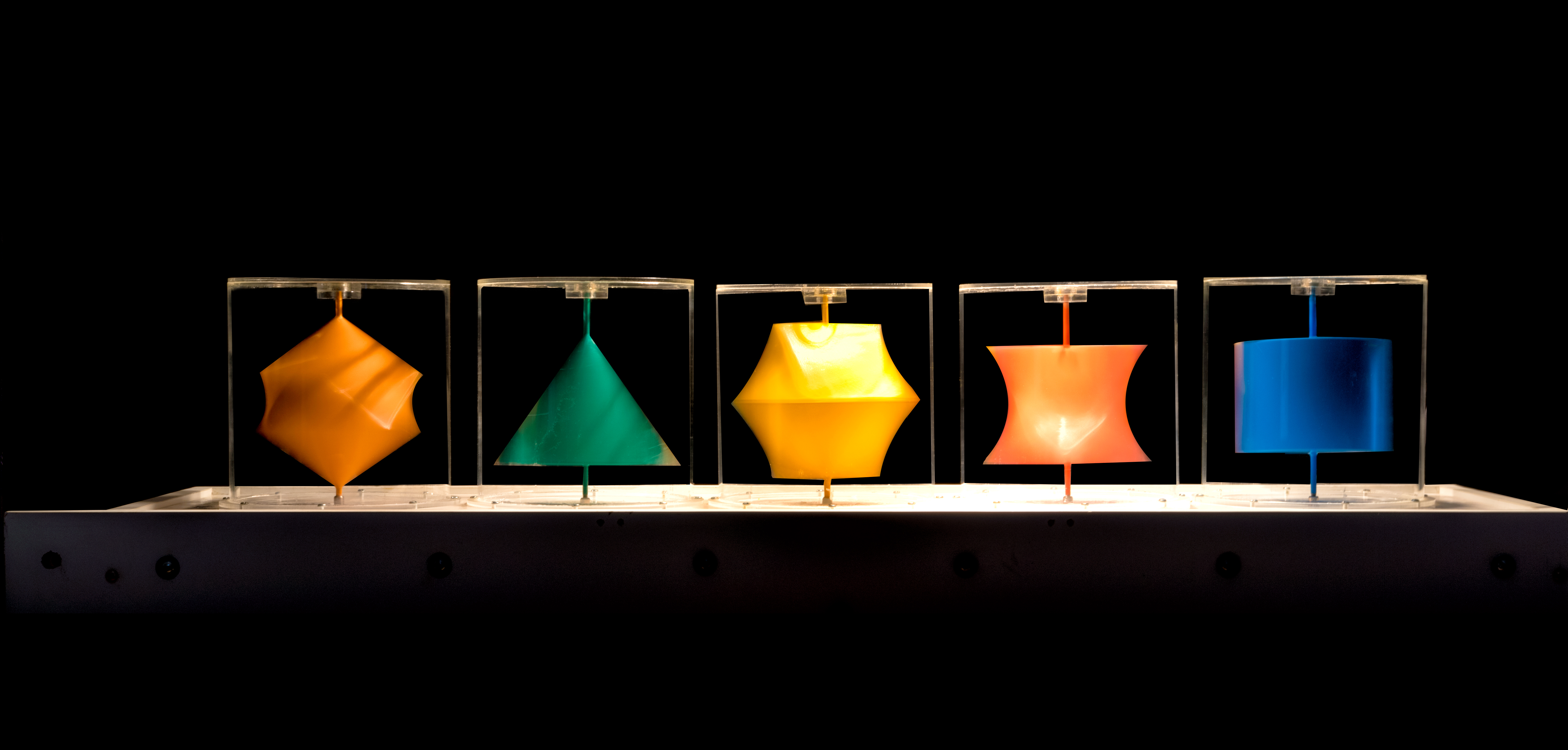
Polyhedra
- Chladni figures
  - Plates made of metal, in various formats, covered with sawdust, which, when suffering interference from the musical notes emitted by the playing of a violin bow, spreads and forms geometric figures.
- Chaotic Water Wheel
  - Made by undergraduate students, in a course taught by two professors from the Mathematics Department of IME and a professor from the FAU, the chaotic water wheel is composed of a wheel made of acrylic material, vertically positioned together with several glasses, thus exerting an unpredictable spinning movement, always alternating sides. The work manifests the chaos, seen in the theory of dynamic systems
- Rocker
  - Having the official name of harmonograph, the structure known as Balancette, an analogy to the swings in parks, is composed of a surface covered with sulphite paper, and is then set in motion so that a pen, fixed to a wooden rod, makes drawings on the sheet by means of the swing.
- Surface topology
  - Retraction in which if two surfaces, when undergoing deformation and take equal shapes without breaking, will be considered similar.
- Regulated Surfaces
  - Refers to curved structures, which contain in their composition only straight lines.
- Double pendulum and the Butterfly Effect
- Articulated Arms
- Anamorphosis of the Mirrored Cylinder
- Centre of Mass of Plane Figures
- Algebraic Topology
- Theory of Nodes and Links
- Convex Polyhedra and Regular Faces
- Calculating Rulers
- Tiling
- Flexible Polyhedra
- Equidecon Ponibility
- Soap Films
- Geometry in the Sphere
- Reuleaux triangle
- Ellipsographs
- Symmetries of the Cube
- The Hex Game
- Descending Washers
- The Rising Cone
- Steiner Trees
- Mountains of Sand
- The Tautocronous Ramp
- The Summing Machine - Base 2
- The Harmonic Series
- Toothed Wheels
- Galton's Board
- The Olympic Revenge Game
- The Monigsberg Bridges
- Three-Dimensional Old Woman's Game
- Icosian
- What's in the Rattles?
- Non-transitive Dice
- The Secret Santa draw
- The impossible triangle
- Breaking Symmetry
- Symmetry Machines
- Polyhedra

== Exhibition history ==
Due to a lack of space at USP for continuous exhibition, the collection is stored and is presented when and where the opportunity arises, in itinerant fashion.

1. State University of Campinas: October 2012, at the UNICAMP Exploratory Science Museum.
2. USP São Carlos: October 2013, at the Center for Scientific and Cultural Disclosure (CDCC).
3. IME-USP: 12 November to 12 December 2014, together with "Pourquoi les mathématiques?", exhibited for the first time in São Paulo. The event marked the beginning of the collaboration between Matemateca and the Maison des Mathématiques et de l'Informatique de Lyon.
4. Virada Malba Tahan: 5 and 6 May 2017, at the IME itself with organization by the Centre for the Improvement of Mathematics Teaching.

== See also ==
- Institute of Mathematics and Statistics, University of São Paulo
- University of São Paulo
- Mathematics education
