= Weibel instability =

The Weibel instability is a plasma instability present in homogeneous or nearly homogeneous electromagnetic plasmas which possess an anisotropy in momentum (velocity) space. This anisotropy is most generally understood as two temperatures in different directions. Burton Fried showed that this instability can be understood more simply as the superposition of many counter-streaming beams. In this sense, it is like the two-stream instability except that the perturbations are electromagnetic and result in filamentation as opposed to electrostatic perturbations which would result in charge bunching. In the linear limit the instability causes exponential growth of electromagnetic fields in the plasma which help restore momentum space isotropy. In very extreme cases, the Weibel instability is related to one- or two-dimensional stream instabilities.

Consider an electron-ion plasma in which the ions are fixed and the electrons are hotter in the y-direction than in x or z-direction.

To see how magnetic field perturbation would grow, suppose a field $B = B_0 \cos(kx)$ spontaneously arises from noise. The Lorentz force then bends the electron trajectories with the result that upward-moving-ev x B electrons congregate at B and downward-moving ones at A. The resulting current $j = -en v_e$ sheets generate magnetic field that enhances the original field and thus perturbation grows.

Weibel instability is also common in astrophysical plasmas, such as collisionless shock formation in supernova remnants and $\gamma$-ray bursts.

== A Simple Example of Weibel Instability ==
As a simple example of Weibel instability, consider an electron beam with density $n_{b0}$ and initial velocity $v_0 \mathbf{z}$ propagating in a plasma of density $n_{p0} = n_{b0}$ with velocity $-v_0 \mathbf{z}$. The analysis below will show how an electromagnetic perturbation in the form of a plane wave gives rise to a Weibel instability in this simple anisotropic plasma system. We assume a non-relativistic plasma for simplicity.

We assume there is no background electric or magnetic field i.e. $\mathbf{B}_0 = \mathbf{E}_0 = 0$. The perturbation will be taken as an electromagnetic wave propagating along $\mathbf{\hat{x}}$, i.e., $\mathbf{k} = k \mathbf{\hat{x}}$. Assume the electric field has the form
$$\mathbf{E}_1 = A e^{i(kx-\omega t)} \mathbf{\hat{z}}$$
With the assumed spatial and time dependence, we may use $\frac{\partial}{\partial t} \rightarrow -i \omega$ and $\nabla \rightarrow i k \mathbf{\hat{x}}$. From Faraday's Law, we may obtain the perturbation magnetic field
$$\begin{align}
\nabla \times \mathbf{E}_1 &= - \frac{\partial \mathbf{B}_1}{\partial t} \\[0.5ex]
\Rightarrow i \mathbf{k} \times \mathbf{E}_1 &= i \omega \mathbf{B}_1 \\[0.5ex]
\Rightarrow \mathbf{B}_1 &= \mathbf{\hat{y}} \frac{k}{\omega} E_1
\end{align}$$
Consider the electron beam. We assume small perturbations, and so linearize the velocity $\mathbf{v}_b = \mathbf{v}_{b0} + \mathbf{v}_{b1}$ and density $n_b = n_{b0} + n_{b1}$. The goal is to find the perturbation electron beam current density
$$\mathbf{J}_{b1} = - e n_b \mathbf{v}_b = - e n_{b0} \mathbf{v}_{b1}  - e n_{b1} \mathbf{v}_{b0}$$
where second-order terms have been neglected. To do that, we start with the fluid momentum equation for the electron beam
$$m \left(\frac{\partial \mathbf{v}_b}{\partial t} + \left(\mathbf{v}_b \cdot \nabla\right) \mathbf{v}_b\right) = - e \left(\mathbf{E} + \mathbf{v}_b \times \mathbf{B}\right)$$
which can be simplified by noting that $\frac{\partial \mathbf{v}_{b0}}{\partial t} = \nabla \cdot \mathbf{v}_{b0} = 0$ and neglecting second-order terms. With the plane wave assumption for the derivatives, the momentum equation becomes
$$-i \omega m \mathbf{v}_{b1} = -e \left( \mathbf{E}_1 + \mathbf{v}_{b0} \times \mathbf{B}_1\right)$$
We can decompose the above equations in components, paying attention to the cross product at the far right, and obtain the non-zero components of the beam velocity perturbation:
$$\begin{align}
v_{b1z} &= \frac{e E_1}{m i \omega} \\[0.5ex]
v_{b1x} &= \frac{e E_1}{m i \omega} \frac{k v_{b0}}{\omega}
\end{align}$$

To find the perturbation density $n_{b1}$, we use the fluid continuity equation for the electron beam
$$\frac{\partial n_b}{\partial t} + \nabla \cdot (n_b \mathbf{v}_b) = 0$$
which can again be simplified by noting that $\frac{\partial n_{b0}}{\partial t} = \nabla n_{b0} = 0$ and neglecting second-order terms. The result is
$$n_{b1} = n_{b0} \frac{k}{\omega} v_{b1x}$$

Using these results, we may use the equation for the beam perturbation current density given above to find
$$\begin{align}
J_{b1x} &= - n_{b0} e^2 E_1 \frac{k v_{b0}}{i m \omega^2} \\
J_{b1z} &= - n_{b0} e^2 E_1 \frac{1}{i m \omega}\left(1+ \frac{k^2 v_{b0}^2}{\omega^2}\right)
\end{align}$$

Analogous expressions can be written for the perturbation current density of the left-moving plasma. By noting that the x-component of the perturbation current density is proportional to $v_0$, we see that with our assumptions for the beam and plasma unperturbed densities and velocities the x-component of the net current density will vanish, whereas the z-components, which are proportional to $v_0^2$, will add. The net current density perturbation is therefore
$$\mathbf{J}_1 = -2 n_{b0} e^2 E_1 \frac{1}{i m \omega}\left(1+ \frac{k^2 v_{b0}^2}{\omega^2}\right) \mathbf{\hat{z}}$$

The dispersion relation can now be found from Maxwell's Equations:
$$\begin{align}
\nabla \times \mathbf{E}_1 &= i \omega \mathbf{B}_1 \\
\nabla \times \mathbf{B}_1 &= \mu_0 \mathbf{J}_1 - i \omega \varepsilon_0 \mu_0 \mathbf{E}_1
\end{align}$$
$$\begin{align}
\Rightarrow \nabla \times \nabla \times \mathbf{E}_1
&= -\nabla^2 \mathbf{E}_1 + \nabla \left(\nabla \cdot \mathbf{E}_1\right) \\[1ex]
&= k^2 \mathbf{E}_1 + i \mathbf{k} \left(i \mathbf{k} \cdot \mathbf{E}_1\right) \\[1ex]
&= k^2 \mathbf{E}_1 \\[1ex]
&= i \omega \nabla \times \mathbf{B}_1 \\[1ex]
&= \frac{i \omega}{c^2 \varepsilon_0} \mathbf{J}_1 + \frac{\omega^2}{c^2} \mathbf{E}_1
\end{align}$$
where $c = \frac{1}{\sqrt{\varepsilon_0 \mu_0}}$ is the speed of light in free space. By defining the effective plasma frequency $\omega_p^2 = \frac{2 n_{b0} e^2}{\varepsilon_0 m}$, the equation above results in
$$\begin{align}
& k^2 - \frac{\omega^2}{c^2} = -\frac{\omega_p^2}{c^2} \left(1 + \frac{k^2v_0^2}{\omega^2}\right) \\[1ex]
&\Rightarrow \omega^4 - \omega^2 \left(\omega_p^2 + k^2 c^2\right) - \omega_p^2 k^2 v_0^2 = 0
\end{align}$$
This bi-quadratic equation may be easily solved to give the dispersion relation
$$\omega^2 = \frac{1}{2} \left(\omega_p^2 + k^2 c^2 \pm \sqrt{\left(\omega_p^2+k^2 c^2\right)^2 + 4 \omega_p^2 k^2 v_0^2} \right)$$
In the search for instabilities, we look for $\Im(\omega) \neq 0$ ($k$ is assumed real). Therefore, we must take the dispersion relation/mode corresponding to the minus sign in the equation above.

To gain further insight on the instability, it is useful to harness our non-relativistic assumption $v_0 \ll c$ to simplify the square root term, by noting that
$$\begin{align}
\sqrt{\left(\omega_p^2 + k^2 c^2\right)^2 + 4 \omega_p^2 k^2 v_0^2} &= \left(\omega_p^2 + k^2 c^2\right) \left(1 + \frac{4 \omega_p^2k^2v_0^2} {\left(\omega_p^2 + k^2 c^2\right)^2}\right)^{1/2} \\[1ex]
&\approx \left(\omega_p^2 + k^2 c^2\right) \left(1+ \frac{2 \omega_p^2k^2v_0^2}{\left(\omega_p^2 + k^2 c^2\right)^2}\right)
\end{align}$$
The resulting dispersion relation is then much simpler
$$\omega^2 = \frac{-\omega_p^2 k^2 v_0^2}{\omega_p^2 + k^2c^2} < 0$$
$\omega$ is purely imaginary. Writing $\omega = i \gamma$
$$\gamma = \frac{\omega_p k v_0}{\left(\omega_p^2 + k^2 c^2\right)^{1/2}}
= \omega_p \frac{v_0}{c} \frac{1}{\left(1+\frac{\omega_p^2}{k^2 c^2}\right)^{1/2}}$$
we see that $\Im(\omega) > 0$, indeed corresponding to an instability.

The electromagnetic fields then have the form
$$\begin{align}
\mathbf{E}_1 &= \mathbf{\hat{z}} A e^{\gamma t + i k x} \\[1ex]
\mathbf{B}_1 &= \mathbf{\hat{y}} \frac{k}{\omega} E_1 = \mathbf{\hat{y}} \frac{k}{i \gamma} A e^{\gamma t + i k x}
\end{align}$$
Therefore, the electric and magnetic fields are $90^\circ$ out of phase, and by noting that
$$\frac{\left|B_1\right|}{\left|E_1\right|} = \frac{k}{\gamma} \propto \frac{c}{v_0} \gg 1$$
so we see this is a primarily magnetic perturbation although there is a non-zero electric perturbation. The magnetic field growth results in the characteristic filamentation structure of Weibel instability. Saturation will happen when the growth rate $\gamma$ is on the order of the electron cyclotron frequency
$$\gamma \sim \omega_p \frac{v_0}{c} \sim \omega_c \Rightarrow B \sim \frac{m}{e} \omega_p \frac{v_0}{c}$$

== See also ==
- Chromo–Weibel instability
