= Catapult (disambiguation) =

A catapult is a device used to throw or hurl a projectile a great distance without the aid of explosive devices.

Catapult(s) or Catapulte may also refer to:

== Computing ==
- Catapult C, a high-level synthesis tool
- Catapult, codename for a precursor to Microsoft Forefront Threat Management Gateway
- Catapult, a graphical user interface for openMSX

== Media and entertainment ==
=== Film ===
- Catapult, a 2009 film set in Berlin

==== Artists ====
- Catapult (band), a Dutch Glam rock band
- Fantastique, a Dutch pop duo formerly known as Catapult

=== Music ===
- "Catapult" (song), a track from the 1996 album Recovering the Satellites by Counting Crows
- Catapult, a 2012 album by Scott Helland
- Catapult, a 2000 EP by Calyx
- "Catapult", a track from the 1992 album A Picture of Nectar by Phish
- "Catapult", a track from the 2010 album Gloves by Operator Please
- "Catapult", a b-side to the 2009 single "Cornerstone" by Arctic Monkeys
- "Catapult", a track from the 1983 album Murmur by R.E.M.
- "Catapult", a track from the 2015 album Written in Scars by Jack Savoretti

=== Television ===
- "Catapult", an episode of British TV series Bodger & Badger
- "Catapult", an episode of US TV series Doing DaVinci
- "Catapulte", an episode of French TV series Minuscule
- Catapult, an event in the UK TV series Gladiators

=== Games ===
- Catapult, a Czech arcade video game

=== Comics ===
- Catapult, a member of the Exiles, a Malibu Comics superhero team
- Catapult, a member of the Hellenders, a DC Comics superhero team

== Military ==
- M-46 Catapult, an Indian self-propelled Howitzer field gun
- Operation Catapult, a British World War II operation to neutralise the French navy
- Aircraft catapult, a steam or electromagnetic device used to launch aircraft from ships
- USS Catapult (LSM-445), later reclassified (YV-1), a US Navy Landing Ship Medium
- Catapulte, a French Navy Arquebuse-class destroyer

== Science ==
- Catapult effect, an effect in electromagnetics

== Amusement park rides ==
- Catapult (ride), a ride at Six Flags New England amusement park
- The Catapult, a ride at Lagoon amusement park, Utah
- Le Catapult, a ride at Busch Gardens Williamsburg amusement park, Virginia
- La Catapulte, a ride at La Ronde amusement park, Montreal

== Companies ==
- Catapult Sports, a sports performance analytics company
- Catapult, a publisher and magazine founded by Elizabeth Koch

== Other ==
- Slingshot, alternatively called a catapult
- Catapult, a bungee jump variation
- Catapult, a 1999 dance work by Diavolo Dance Theater
- Catapult, a line of athletic shoes by LA Gear
- Catapult, a professional wrestling throw

== See also ==
- Katapult (disambiguation)
