= Critical line =

Critical line may refer to:

- In mathematics, a specific subset of the complex numbers asserted by the Riemann hypothesis to be the locus of all non-trivial zeroes of the Riemann zeta function
- Critical line theorem, a mathematical theorem saying that the proportion of nontrivial zeros of the Riemann zeta function lying on the critical line is greater than zero
- Critical line (thermodynamics), a higher-dimensional equivalent of a critical point
- Critical Line, an art exhibition
- Critical line method, a procedure in Portfolio optimization
