= Theorem of corresponding states =

According to van der Waals, the theorem of corresponding states (or principle/law of corresponding states) indicates that all fluids, when compared at the same reduced temperature and reduced pressure, have approximately the same compressibility factor and all deviate from ideal gas behavior to about the same degree.

Material constants that vary for each type of material are eliminated, in a recast reduced form of a constitutive equation. The reduced variables are defined in terms of critical variables.

The principle originated with the work of Johannes Diderik van der Waals in about 1873 when he used the critical temperature and critical pressure to derive a universal property of all fluids that follow the van der Waals equation of state. It predicts a value of $3/8 = 0.375$ that is found to be an overestimate when compared to real gases.

Edward A. Guggenheim used the phrase "Principle of Corresponding States" in an oft-cited paper to describe the phenomenon where different systems have very similar behaviors when near a critical point.

There are many examples of non-ideal gas models which satisfy this theorem, such as the van der Waals model, the Dieterici model, and so on, that can be found on the page on real gases.

== Compressibility factor at the critical point ==
The compressibility factor at the critical point, which is defined as $Z_c=\frac{P_c v_c \mu}{R T_c}$, where the subscript $c$ indicates physical quantities measured at the critical point, is predicted to be a constant independent of substance by many equations of state.

The table below for a selection of gases uses the following conventions:

- $T_c$: critical temperature [K]
- $P_c$: critical pressure [Pa]
- $v_c$: critical specific volume [m^{3}⋅kg^{−1}]
- $R$: gas constant (8.314 J⋅K^{−1}⋅mol^{−1})
- $\mu$: Molar mass [kg⋅mol^{−1}]

Substance	$P_c$ [Pa]	$T_c$ [K]	$v_c$ [m^{3}/kg]	$Z_c$
H_{2}O	21.817×10^{6}	647.3	3.154×10^{−3}	0.23
^{4}He	0.226×10^{6}	5.2	14.43×10^{−3}	0.31
He	0.226×10^{6}	5.2	14.43×10^{−3}	0.30
H_{2}	1.279×10^{6}	33.2	32.3×10^{−3}	0.30
Ne	2.73×10^{6}	44.5	2.066×10^{−3}	0.29
N_{2}	3.354×10^{6}	126.2	3.2154×10^{−3}	0.29
Ar	4.861×10^{6}	150.7	1.883×10^{−3}	0.29
Xe	5.87×10^{6}	289.7	0.9049×10^{−3}	0.29
O_{2}	5.014×10^{6}	154.8	2.33×10^{−3}	0.291
CO_{2}	7.290×10^{6}	304.2	2.17×10^{−3}	0.275
SO_{2}	7.88×10^{6}	430.0	1.900×10^{−3}	0.275
CH_{4}	4.58×10^{6}	190.7	6.17×10^{−3}	0.285
C_{3}H_{8}	4.21×10^{6}	370.0	4.425×10^{−3}	0.267

== See also ==
- Van der Waals equation
- Equation of state
- Compressibility factors
- Johannes Diderik van der Waals equation
- Noro-Frenkel law of corresponding states
