= Noro–Frenkel law of corresponding states =

The Noro–Frenkel law of corresponding states is an equation in thermodynamics that describes the critical temperature of the liquid-gas transition T as a function of the range of the attractive potential R. It states that all short-ranged spherically symmetric pair-wise additive attractive potentials are characterised by the same thermodynamics properties, if compared at the same reduced density and second virial coefficient

== Description ==
Johannes Diderik van der Waals's law of corresponding states expresses the fact that there are basic similarities in the thermodynamic properties of all simple gases. Its essential feature is that if we scale the thermodynamic variables that describe an equation of state (temperature, pressure, and volume) with respect to their values at the liquid-gas critical point, all simple fluids obey the same reduced equation of state.

Massimo G. Noro and Daan Frenkel formulated an extended law of corresponding states that predicts the phase behaviour of short-ranged potentials on the basis of the effective pair potential alone – extending the validity of the van der Waals law to systems interacting through pair potentials with different functional forms.

The Noro–Frenkel law suggests to condensate the three quantities which are expected to play a role in the thermodynamics behavior of a system (hard-core size, interaction energy and range) into a combination of only two quantities: an effective hard core diameter and the reduced second virial coefficient. Noro and Frenkel suggested to determine the effective hard core diameter following the expression suggested by Barker based on the separation of the potential into attractive V_{att} and repulsive V_{rep} parts used in the Weeks–Chandler– Andersen method. The reduced second virial coefficient, i.e., the second virial coefficient B_{2} divided by the second virial coefficient of hard spheres with the effective diameter can be calculated (or experimentally measured) once the potential is known. B_{2} is defined as

$$B_2=2\pi\int_0^\infty r^2\left[ 1-e^{-V(r)/k_\text{B}T} \right] dr$$

== Applications ==
The Noro–Frenkel law is particularly useful for the description of colloidal and globular protein solutions, for which the range of the potential is indeed significantly smaller than the particle size. For these systems the thermodynamic properties can be re-written as a function of only two parameters, the reduced density (using the effective diameter as length scale) and the reduced second-virial coefficient B^{*}_{2}. The gas-liquid critical point of all systems satisfying the extended law of corresponding states are characterized by same values of B^{*}_{2} at the critical point.

The Noro-Frenkel law can be generalized to particles with limited valency (i.e. to non spherical interactions). Particles interacting with different potential ranges but identical valence behave again according to the generalized law, but with a different value for each valence of B^{*}_{2} at the critical point.

== See also ==
- Equation of states
- Van der Waals equation
