= Close coupling =

In atomic physics, close coupling is a quantum mechanics method to calculate the multi-electronic atomic and molecular structure from fine structure to hyperfine structure levels and dynamic processes including photoionization, collisional excitation and ionization as well as autoionization and their inverse processes. In this method, the multi-electron systems are treated as a loosely interacting electron with a target ionic or neutral atomic as well as molecular, in which the electrons are strongly interactive with each other. The interactive atomic or molecular complex system is reduced into a so-called (N+1) problem. Based on this scheme, the inter-channel interaction, that is, configuration interactions (CI) are involved.

Integrated with other techniques, especially the matrix techniques and multi-channel quantum defect theory, close-coupling method could provide precise structural and dynamical studies of atomic and molecular systems.
