= Chemical Vapor Deposition (journal) =

- Discipline: Materials science
- Language: English
- Edited by: Peter Gregory

Publication details
- History: 1995–2015
- Publisher: Wiley-VCH
- Frequency: Monthly
- Impact factor: 1.333 (2016)

Standard abbreviations
- ISO 4: Chem. Vap. Depos.

Indexing
- CODEN: CVDEFX
- ISSN: 0948-1907 (print); 1521-3862 (web)
- LCCN: sn96038108
- OCLC no.: 865512213

Links
- Journal homepage; Online archive

Chemical Vapor Deposition was a monthly peer-reviewed scientific journal covering materials science. It was established in 1995 and ceased independent publication in 2015, when it became a section of Advanced Materials Interfaces. The journal was published by Wiley-VCH and the editor-in-chief was Peter Gregory.

== Abstracting and indexing ==
The journal was abstracted and indexed in:

- Chemical Abstracts Service
- Compendex
- Current Contents/Engineering, Computing & Technology
- Current Contents/Physical, Chemical & Earth Sciences
- Inspec
- Science Citation Index
- Scopus

According to the Journal Citation Reports, the journal's final (2016) impact factor was 1.333.
