= Katapult (disambiguation) =

Katapult is a discontinued free application launcher for the KDE desktop environment.

Katapult may also refer to:

- Katapult (album), an album by Finnish rock band Circle
- Katapult (band) – Czech rock band

== See also ==
- Catapult (disambiguation)
