= Constrained-layer damping =

Mechanical engineering technique for suppression of vibration

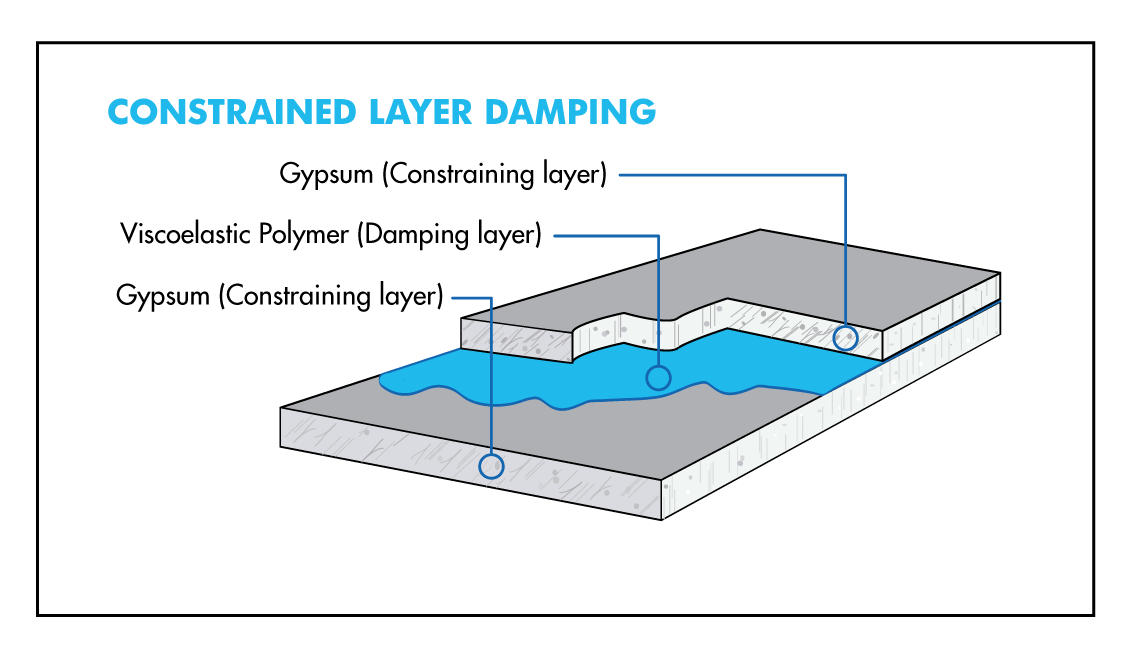
Gypsum panel with constrained-layer damping

Constrained-layer damping is a mechanical engineering technique to suppress vibrations. Typically a viscoelastic or other damping material, is sandwiched between two sheets of stiff materials that lack sufficient damping by themselves. The result is that any vibration generated on either side of the constraining materials (the two stiffer materials on the sides) is suppressed by the viscoelastic material, by turning it into heat. The damping is associated with the shear deformation of the viscoelastic material.
