= Critical distance =

At which direct and reverberant sounds have equal pressure

Critical distance is, in acoustics, the distance at which the sound pressure level of the direct sound D and the reverberant sound R are equal when dealing with a directional source. As the source is directional, the sound pressure as a function of distance between source and sampling point (listener) varies with their relative position, so that for a particular room and source the set of points where direct and reverberant sound pressure are equal constitutes a surface rather than a distinguished location in the room. In other words, it is the point in space at which the combined amplitude of all the reflected echoes are the same as the amplitude of the sound coming directly from the source (D = R). This distance, called the critical distance $d_c$, is dependent on the geometry and absorption of the space in which the sound waves propagate, as well as the dimensions and shape of the sound source.

In a reverberant space, the sound perceived by a listener is a combination of direct and reverberant sound. The ratio of direct sound is dependent on the distance between the source and the listener, and upon the reverberation time in [the room]. At a certain distance the two will be equal. This is called the "critical distance."

— Glenn White and Gary Louie (2005)

A reverberant room generates a short critical distance and an acoustically dead (anechoic) room generates a longer critical distance.

== Calculation ==
The calculation of the critical distance for a diffuse approximation of the reverberant field:

$$d_c = \frac{1}{4} \sqrt \frac{\gamma A}{\pi} \approx 0.057 \sqrt \frac{\gamma V}{RT_{60}} ,$$

where $\gamma$ is the degree of directivity of the source ($\gamma = 1$ for an omnidirectional source), $A$ the equivalent absorption surface, $V$ the room volume in m^{3} and $RT_{60}$ the reverberation time of room in seconds. The latter approximation is using Sabine's reverberation formula $RT_{60}=V/6A$.
