= Crypton (particle) =

Hypothetical superheavy particle

In particle physics, the crypton is a hypothetical superheavy particle, thought to exist in a hidden sector of string theory. It has been proposed as a candidate particle to explain the dark matter content of the universe. Cryptons arising in the hidden sector of a superstring-derived flipped SU(5) GUT model have been shown to be metastable with a lifetime exceeding the age of the universe. Their slow decays may provide a source for the ultra-high-energy cosmic rays (UHECR).
