= Chronic lung disease =

Chronic lung disease may refer to:

- Asthma
- Bronchopulmonary dysplasia
- Chronic obstructive pulmonary disease, including chronic bronchitis and emphysema
