= Complementary experiments =

In physics, two experimental techniques are often called complementary if they investigate the same subject in two different ways such that two different (ideally non-overlapping) properties or aspects can be investigated. For example, X-ray scattering and neutron scattering experiments are often said to be complementary because the former reveals information about the electron density of the atoms in the target but gives no information about the nuclei (because they are too small to affect the X-rays significantly), while the latter allows one to investigate the nuclei of the atoms but cannot tell one anything about their electron hulls (because the neutrons, being neutral, do not interact with the charged electrons).

Scattering experiments are sometimes also called complementary when they investigate the same physical property of a system from two complementary view points in the sense of Bohr. For example, time-resolved and energy-resolved experiments are said to be complementary. The former uses a pulse which is well-defined in time. The latter uses a monochromatic pulse well defined in energy (its frequency is well known).

== See also ==
- Complement (disambiguation)
