= Chromo–Weibel instability =

Instability in non-abelian plasmas

The Chromo–Weibel instability is a plasma instability present in homogeneous or nearly homogeneous non-abelian plasmas which possess an anisotropy in momentum space. In the linear limit it is similar to the Weibel instability in electromagnetic plasmas but due to non-linear interactions present in non-abelian plasmas the late development of this instability is characterized by a turbulent cascade of modes. This instability is relevant in the understanding of the early-time dynamics of the quark-gluon plasma as produced in heavy-ion collisions.
