= Advanced Materials Interfaces =

- Discipline: Materials science
- Language: English
- Edited by: Jolke Perelaer

Publication details
- History: 2014–present
- Publisher: Wiley-VCH
- Frequency: 24/year
- Open access: Hybrid
- Impact factor: 6.389 (2021)

Standard abbreviations
- ISO 4: Adv. Mater. Interfaces

Indexing
- CODEN: AMIDD2
- ISSN: 2196-7350

Links
- Journal homepage; Online access; Online archive

Advanced Materials Interfaces is a peer-reviewed scientific journal covering materials science, including research on functional interfaces and surfaces and their specific applications.

== Abstracting and indexing ==
The journal is abstracted and indexed in:

- Chemical Abstracts Service
- Current Contents/Physical, Chemical & Earth Sciences
- Scopus
- Science Citation Index Expanded

According to the Journal Citation Reports, the journal has a 2021 impact factor of 6.389, ranking it 48th out of 179 journals in the category "Chemistry, Multidisciplinary" and 95th out of 345 journals in the category "Materials Science, Multidisciplinary".
