= 8967 Calandra =

Carbonaceous background asteroid

Discovery
- Discovered by: C. J. van Houten; I. van Houten-G. T. Gehrels
- Discovery site: Palomar Obs.
- Discovery date: 13 May 1971

Designations
- Pronunciation: /kəˈlændrə/
- Named after: Miliaria calandra (a species of bunting)
- Alternative designations: 4878 T-1 · 1978 RM_{11} 1992 EH_{15}
- Minor planet category: main-belt · (outer) background

Orbital characteristics
- Epoch 4 September 2017 (JD 2458000.5)
- Uncertainty parameter 0
- Observation arc: 45.76 yr (16,714 days)
- Aphelion: 3.4081 AU
- Perihelion: 2.7043 AU
- Semi-major axis: 3.0562 AU
- Eccentricity: 0.1151
- Orbital period (sidereal): 5.34 yr (1,952 days)
- Mean anomaly: 99.067°
- Mean motion: 0° 11^{m} 4.2^{s} / day
- Inclination: 9.7428°
- Longitude of ascending node: 170.63°
- Argument of perihelion: 171.63°

Physical characteristics
- Dimensions: 8.382±0.103 km 10.92 km (calculated)
- Synodic rotation period: 5.2427±0.0036 h
- Geometric albedo: 0.057 (assumed); 0.174±0.030
- Spectral type: C
- Absolute magnitude (H): 13.1 · 13.54 · 12.9 · 13.086±0.004 · 13.30±0.10

8967 Calandra, provisional designation 4878 T-1, is a carbonaceous background asteroid from the outer region of the asteroid belt, approximately 9 kilometers in diameter. It was discovered on 13 May 1971, by Dutch astronomer couple Ingrid and Cornelis van Houten at Leiden Observatory, on photographic plates taken by Dutch–American astronomer Tom Gehrels at the Palomar Observatory in California. It is named after the corn bunting (Emberiza calandra).

== Orbit and classification ==
Calandra is a non-family asteroid from the main belt's background population. It orbits the Sun in the outer main-belt at a distance of 2.7–3.4 AU once every 5 years and 4 months (1,952 days). Its orbit has an eccentricity of 0.12 and an inclination of 10° with respect to the ecliptic. No precoveries were taken prior to its discovery.

=== Survey designation ===
The survey designation "T-1" stands for the first Palomar–Leiden Trojan survey, named after the fruitful collaboration of the Palomar and Leiden Observatory in the 1960s and 1970s. Gehrels used Palomar's Samuel Oschin telescope (also known as the 48-inch Schmidt Telescope), and shipped the photographic plates to Cornelis and Ingrid van Houten at Leiden Observatory where astrometry was carried out. The trio of astronomers are credited with the discovery of 4,620 minor planets.

== Physical characteristics ==
=== Rotation period ===
A photometric lightcurve of Calandra obtained at the Palomar Transient Factory in California in 2011, gave a rotation period of 5.2427±0.0036 hours with a brightness variation of 0.58 magnitude (U=2).

=== Diameter and albedo ===
According to the survey carried out by the NEOWISE mission of NASA's Wide-field Infrared Survey Explorer, Calandra measures 8.4 kilometers in diameter and its surface has an albedo of 0.17. The Collaborative Asteroid Lightcurve Link assumes a standard albedo for carbonaceous asteroids of 0.057 and hence calculates a larger diameter of 10.2 kilometers with an absolute magnitude of 13.54.

== Naming ==
This minor planet is named for the passerine bird, Miliaria calandra or Emberiza calandra, also known as the corn bunting. It is listed as an endangered species on the European Red List of Birds. The approved naming citation was published by the Minor Planet Center on 2 February 1999 (M.P.C. 33794; 34089).
