= Two-stream instability =

The two-stream instability is a very common instability in plasma physics. It can be induced by an energetic particle stream injected in a plasma, or setting a current along the plasma so different species (ions and electrons) can have different drift velocities. The energy from the particles can lead to plasma wave excitation.

Two-stream instability can arise from the case of two cold beams, in which no particles are resonant with the wave, or from two hot beams, in which there exist particles from one or both beams which are resonant with the wave.

Two-stream instability is known in various limiting cases as beam-plasma instability, beam instability, or bump-on-tail instability.

== Dispersion relation in cold-beam limit ==
Consider a cold, uniform, and unmagnetized plasma, where ions are stationary and the electrons have velocity $v_0$, that is, the reference frame is moving with the ion stream. Let the electrostatic waves be of the form:

$$\mathbf{E}_1 = \xi_1 \exp[i(kx - \omega t)] \mathbf{\hat{x}}$$

Applying linearization techniques to the equation of motions for both species, to the equation of continuity, and Poisson's equation, and introducing the spatial and temporal harmonic operators $\partial_t \rightarrow -i\omega$, $\nabla \rightarrow ik$ we can get the following expression:

$$1 = \omega_{pe}^2 \left[\frac{m_e/m_i}{\omega^2} + \frac{1}{(\omega - kv_0)^2} \right],$$

which represents the dispersion relation for longitudinal waves, and represents a quartic equation in $\omega$. The roots can be expressed in the form:

$$\omega_j = \omega_j^R + i\gamma_j$$

If the imaginary part ($\operatorname{Im}(\omega_j)$) is zero, then the solutions represent all the possible modes, and there is no temporal wave growth or damping at all:

$$\mathbf{E} = \xi \exp[i(kx - \omega t)] \mathbf{\hat{x}}$$

If $\operatorname{Im}(\omega_j) \ne 0$, that is, any of the roots are complex, they will occur in complex conjugate pairs. Substituting in the expression for electrostatic waves leads to:

$$\mathbf{E} = \xi \exp\left[i(kx - \omega_j^R t) + \gamma t\right] \mathbf{\hat{x}}$$

Because of the second exponential function at the right, the temporal dynamics of the wave amplitude depends strongly on the parameter $\gamma$; if $\gamma < 0$, then the waves will be exponentially damped; on the other hand, if $\gamma > 0$, then the waves are unstable and will grow at an exponential rate.

== Wave–particle interactions ==
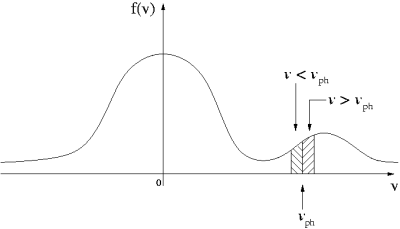

In the hot-beam case, the two-stream instability can be thought of as the inverse of Landau damping. There are particles which have the same velocity as the wave. The existence of a greater number of particles that move slower than the wave phase velocity $v_{ph}$ as compared with those that move faster, leads to an energy transfer from the wave to the particles. In the case of the two-stream instability, when an electron stream is injected to the plasma, the particles' velocity distribution function has a "bump" on its "tail". If a wave has phase velocity in the region where the slope is positive, there is a greater number of faster particles ($v > v_\text{ph}$) than slower particles, and so there is a greater amount of energy being transferred from the fast particles to the wave, giving rise to exponential wave growth.

In the cold-beam case, there are no particles which have the same velocity as the phase velocity of the wave (no particles are resonant). However, the wave can grow exponentially even so; this is the case discussed in the above section. In this case, the beam particles are bunched in space in a propagating wave in a self-reinforcing way even though no particles move with the propagation velocity.

In both the hot-beam and cold-beam case, the instability grows until the beam particles are trapped in the electric field of the wave. This is when the instability is said to saturate.

== Bibliography ==
- Bittencourt, J. A. (2004). Fundamentals of Plasma Physics (3rd ed.). New York: Springer-Verlag. ISBN 978-0-387-20975-3.
- Chen, Francis F. (1984). Introduction to Plasma Physics and Controlled Fusion (2nd ed.). New York: Plenum Press.
- Nicholson, D. R. (1983). Introduction to Plasma Theory. New York: John Wiley & Sons. ISBN 047109045X.
- Tsurutani, B.; Lakhina, G. (1997). "Some basic concepts of wave–particle interactions in collisionless plasmas". Reviews of Geophysics. 35 (4): 491–502. Bibcode:1997RvGeo..35..491T. doi:10.1029/97RG02200.
