= CFD-DEM model =

Model suitable for modeling or simulation

A CFD-DEM model is suitable for the modeling or simulation of fluid-solids or fluid-particles systems. In a typical CFD-DEM model, the phase motion of discrete solids or particles is obtained by the Discrete Element Method (DEM) which applies Newton's laws of motion to every particle and the flow of continuum fluid is described by the local averaged Navier–Stokes equations that can be solved by the traditional Computational Fluid Dynamics (CFD). The model is first proposed by Tsuji et al. The interactions between the fluid phase and solids phase is better modeled according to Newton's third law. Subsequent developments classified CFD–DEM methods into resolved, semi-resolved, and unresolved coupling approaches according to the grid-to-particle size ratio. In resolved coupling, hydrodynamic forces are obtained by directly resolving the flow around particles using techniques such as the Immersed boundary method (IBM) and the Fictitious domain method (FDM). In contrast, semi-resolved and unresolved approaches rely on empirical or semi-empirical force models to represent fluid–particle interactions. The semi-resolved approach occupies an intermediate regime, employing kernel-based reconstruction techniques to recover local background fields, such as fluid velocity, temperature, and volume fraction, thereby enabling more accurate calculations of interphase momentum and heat transfer.

== Software ==
Open source and non-commercial software:

- The open source CFD software OpenFOAM includes particle methods, including DEM, and solvers that couple CFD-DEM.
- CFDEMcoupling (DCS Computing GmbH) couples CFD from OpenFOAM with open source DEM software, LIGGGHTS.
- MFiX(Open Source multiphase flow simulation package).
- The commercial software Simcenter STAR-CCM+ is an integrated multiphysics solution capable of CFD-DEM coupling involving single or multiphase flow, chemical reactions, electromagnetism and heat transfer

== Parallelization ==
OpenMP has been shown to be more efficient in performing coupled CFD-DEM calculations in parallel framework as compared to MPI by Amritkar et al.
