= Collisional excitation =

Collisional excitation is a process in which the kinetic energy of a collision partner is converted into the internal energy of a reactant species.

== Astronomy ==
In astronomy, collisional excitation gives rise to spectral lines in the spectra of astronomical objects such as planetary nebulae and H II regions.

In these objects, most atoms are ionised by photons from hot stars embedded within the nebular gas, stripping away electrons. The emitted electrons, (called photoelectrons), may collide with atoms or ions within the gas, and excite them. When these excited atoms or ions revert to their ground state, they will emit a photon. The spectral lines formed by these photons are called collisionally excited lines (often abbreviated to CELs).

CELs are only seen in gases at very low densities (typically less than a few thousand particles per cm³) for forbidden transitions. For allowed transitions, the gas density can be substantially higher. At higher densities, the reverse process of collisional de-excitation suppresses the lines. Even the hardest vacuum produced on Earth is still too dense for CELs to be observed. For this reason, when CELs were first observed by William Huggins in the spectrum of the Cat's Eye Nebula, he did not know what they were, and attributed them to a hypothetical new element called nebulium. However, the lines he observed were later found to be emitted by extremely rarefied oxygen.

CELs are very important in the study of gaseous nebulae, because they can be used to determine the density and temperature of the gas.

== Mass spectrometry ==
Collisional excitation in mass spectrometry is the process where an ion collides with an atom or molecule and leads to an increase in the internal energy of the ion. Molecular ions are accelerated to high kinetic energy and then collide with neutral gas molecules (e.g. helium, nitrogen or argon). In the collision some of the kinetic energy is converted into internal energy which results in fragmentation in a process known as collision-induced dissociation.

== See also ==
- Collision-induced absorption and emission
