= Charles Tahan =

American physicist

Assistant Director For Quantum Information Science, Office of Science and Technology Policy and Director, National Quantum Coordination Office

Chief Scientist, Laboratory for Physical Sciences, National Security Agency

Personal details
- Education: College of William & Mary (BS); University of Wisconsin-Madison (PhD)

Charles Tahan is a U.S. physicist specializing in condensed matter physics and quantum information science and technology. He currently serves as the Assistant Director for Quantum Information Science (QIS) and the Director of the National Quantum Coordination Office (NQCO) within the White House Office of Science and Technology Policy. Tahan is also Chief Scientist of the National Security Agency's Laboratory for Physical Sciences.

== Education ==
Tahan grew up in Northern Virginia, the son of a Lebanese immigrant. He graduated from Gonzaga College High School in Washington, D.C., in 1996 where he was a Westinghouse Science Talent Search semifinalist and may have created the first web page for a high school. He earned a B.Sc. in physics and computer science with Highest Honors from the College of William & Mary in 2000 and a PhD in physics at the University of Wisconsin-Madison in 2005 in silicon quantum computing. From 2005-2007 he was a National Science Foundation Distinguished International Postdoctoral Research Fellow at the University of Cambridge, UK; the Center for Quantum Computing Technology, Australia; and the University of Tokyo, Japan.

== Career ==
Tahan served as chief technical consultant for quantum information science and technology programs in DARPA’s Microsystems Technology Office (MTO) while at Booz Allen Hamilton from 2007-2009 helping to launch new DARPA programs such as QuEST and QIS. He joined the National Security Agency's Laboratory for Physical Sciences in 2009 as a physicist and technical program manager. As a program manager, Tahan stood up major research programs in silicon and superconducting quantum computing; quantum characterization, verification, and validation (coining the term QCVV); and new and emerging qubit science and technology.

As a practicing physicist, Tahan pioneered new approaches to silicon and superconducting quantum computing, strongly correlated photonics and solid light, quantum acoustics and cavity phonodynamics, and epitaxial superconductors.

Tahan was Technical Director of the Laboratory for Physical Sciences in 2015-2020.

Tahan became the first Director of the National Quantum Coordination Office in June, 2020. He is currently Chief Scientist of LPS and the Chief of the QIS research office.

Tahan’s contributions have been recognized by the Researcher of the Year Award, the Presidential Early Career Award for Scientists and Engineers, election as a Fellow of the American Physical Society, and as an ODNI Science and Technology Fellow.

== Science and Society ==
Tahan served as founding Executive Secretary of the NSTC Subcommittee on Quantum Information Science and the NSTC Economic and Security Implications of Quantum Science Subcommittee. Tahan served on the Defense Science Board Quantum Task Force and for the National Academy of Sciences. Tahan co-chairs the National Quantum Initiative Advisory Committee.

As a graduate student in 2005, Tahan created and taught a new course on ‘’Nanotechnology and Society’’ and subsequently explored the societal impacts of nanotechnology and did early analysis of the quantum industry. Tahan coined the term spookytechnology in 2007 as a way to promote his proposed definition for quantum information technologies.

Tahan is creator of Meqanic, one of the first games meant to build intuition about quantum computing and the Qubit Zoo.
