= Ceiling level =

In audio equipment the ceiling level, also known as the point of distortion, is the maximum input signal amplitude above which output distortion exceeds an acceptable level. The Ceiling Level or Ceiling Value is the maximum permissible concentration of a hazardous material in the working environment. This level should not be exceeded at any time. It is usually (but not invariably) set somewhat above the relevant time-weighted average for the chemical.
