= Cobra probe =

Device to measure the pressure and velocity components of a moving fluid

A Cobra probe is a device to measure the pressure and velocity components of a moving fluid. It is a multi-holed pressure probe with the rotational axis of the probe shaft coplanar with the measurement plane of the instrument. Because of this geometry, when the instrument is rotated around the shaft's axis, the measurement elements of the probe remain in the same location. The name cobra probe comes from the shape of the probe head, which resembles a cobra and gives it this property.

Cobra probes come in three-, four-, and five-hole configurations, the former used for two-dimensional flow measurement, the latter two for three-dimensional flow measurement. In the three-hole kind of instrument, there are two yaw direction tubes which are chamfered and silver soldered symmetrically on the two sides of a pitot tube. It is otherwise similar to the other kinds of yawmeters. In the four- and five-hole configurations, the central pitot tube is surrounded by three or four chamfered tubes, respectively.
