= Clinical biophysics =

Branch of medical science

Clinical biophysics is that branch of medical science that studies the action process and the effects of non-ionising physical energies utilised for therapeutic purposes. Physical energy can be applied for diagnostic or therapeutic aims.

The principle on which clinical biophysics is based are represented by the recognizability and the specificity of the physical signal applied:

- recognizability: the capacity of the biological target to recognise the presence of the physical energy: this aspect becomes more important with the lowering of the energy applied.
- specificity: the capacity of the physical agent applied to the biological target to obtain a response depending on its physical characteristics: frequency, length, energy, etc. The effects do not necessarily depend on the quantity of energy applied to the biological target.

== Definition ==
Several papers show that the response of a biological system when exposed to non-ionizing physical stimuli is not necessarily dependent on the amount of energy applied. Specific combinations of amplitude, frequency and waveform may trigger the most intense response. For example, cell proliferation or activation of metabolic pathways. This has been demonstrated for:

a) mechanical strains directly applied to the cells or tissue;
b) mechanical energy applied by ultrasound;
c) electromagnetic field exposure;
d) electric field exposure.

Several pre-clinical experiences have laid the foundation to identify exposure conditions that may be used in humans to treat diseases or to promote tissue healing. The identification of the best parameters to apply in any particular circumstance is the current goal of research activities in the field.

== Medical applications ==
- Orthopaedics
- PEMF
- LIPUS
- CCEF
- Direct current
- Neurology
- Plastic surgery
- Oncology
