= Constantine Pozrikidis =

American chemical engineer

Constantine Pozrikidis is a Professor of Chemical Engineering at the University of Massachusetts Amherst, known for his contributions in the areas of theoretical and computational fluid dynamics, applied mathematics, and scientific computing.

Costas Pozrikidis received his M.S. and Ph.D. in chemical engineering from the University of Illinois in 1983 and 1985 respectively. He was a research scientist at the Eastman Kodak Research Laboratories in Rochester, New York from 1985 to 1987. He has been on the faculty of UCSD since 1987.

== Books ==
- C. Pozrikidis, Boundary Integral and Singularity Methods for Linearized Viscous Flow, Cambridge University Press (1992).
- C. Pozrikidis, Introduction to Theoretical and Computational Fluid Dynamics, 1st ed., Oxford University Press (1997). 2nd ed. (2011).
- C. Pozrikidis, Numerical Computation in Science and Engineering, 1st ed., Oxford University Press (1998). 2nd ed. (2008).
- C. Pozrikidis, Little Book of Streamlines, Academic Press (1999).
- C. Pozrikidis, Fluid Dynamics: Theory, Computation and Numerical Simulation; Accompanied by the Software Library FDLIB, 1st ed., Kluwer Academic Publishers (2001). 2nd ed., Springer (2009).
- C. Pozrikidis, A Practical Guide to Boundary-Element Methods with the Software Library BEMLIB, Taylor and Francis/CRC Press (2002).
- C. Pozrikidis (Editor), Modeling and Simulation of Capsules and Biological Cells, Taylor and Francis/CRC Press (2003).
- C. Pozrikidis, Introduction to Finite and Spectral Element Methods using Matlab, Chapman & Hall/CRC Press (2005).
- C. Pozrikidis, Introduction to C++ Programming and Graphics, Springer (2007).
- C. Pozrikidis (Editor), Computational Hydrodynamics of Capsules and Biological Cells, Taylor and Francis/CRC Press (2010).
