= Concentric tube heat exchanger =

Concentric Tube (or Pipe) Heat Exchangers are used in a variety of industries for purposes such as material processing, food preparation, and air-conditioning. They create a temperature driving force by passing fluid streams of different temperatures parallel to each other, separated by a physical boundary in the form of a pipe. This induces forced convection, transferring heat to/from the product.

== Theory ==
The thermodynamic behaviour of concentric tube heat exchangers can be described by both empirical and numerical analysis. The simplest of these involve the use of correlations to model heat transfer; however, the accuracy of these predictions varies depending on the design. For turbulent, non-viscous fluids the Dittus-Boelter Equation can be used to determine the heat transfer coefficient for both the inner and outer streams; given their diameters and velocities (or flow rates). For conditions where thermal properties vary significantly, such as for large temperature differences, the Seider-Tate Correlation is used. This model takes into consideration the differences between bulk and wall viscosities. Both correlations utilize the Nusselt number and are only valid when the Reynolds number is greater than 10,000. While Dittus-Boelter requires the Prandtl number to be between 0.7 and 160, Seider-Tate applies to values between 0.7 and 16,700.

For calculations involving the outer stream, the equivalent diameter (or mean hydraulic radius) is used in place of the geometric diameter, as the cross-sectional area of the annulus is not circular. Equivalent diameters are also used for irregular shapes such as rectangular and triangular ducts. For concentric tubes, this relationship simplifies to the difference between the diameters of the shell and the outer surface of the inner tube.

$D_{\mathrm{eo}} = \frac{4\cdot Area}{Wetted Perimeter}$

After the heat transfer coefficients (h_{i} and h_{o}) are determined, knowing the resistance due to fouling and thermal conductivity of the boundary material (k_{w}), the Overall Heat Transfer coefficient (U_{o}) can be calculated.

${1\over U_{o}} = {R_{fo}} + {R_{fi}}\cdot \frac{D_{o}}{D_{i}} + \frac{D_{o}}{2k_{w}}\cdot \ln {\frac{D_{o}}{D_{i}}} + {1\over h_{o}} + {1\over h_{i}}\cdot \frac{D_{o}}{D_{i}}$

The length of heat exchanger required can then be expressed as a function of the rate of heat transfer:

$A = \frac{Q}{U \Delta T}$

Where A is the surface area available for heat transfer and ∆T is the log mean temperature difference. From these results, the NTU method can be performed to calculate the heat exchanger's effectiveness.

$q_{max}\equiv C_{min} (T_{h,i}-T_{c,i})$

where

$E \equiv \frac{q}{q_{max}}$

== Concentric tube heat exchanger design ==
The primary advantage of a concentric configuration, as opposed to a plate or shell and tube heat exchanger, is the simplicity of their design. As such, the insides of both surfaces are easy to clean and maintain, making it ideal for fluids that cause fouling. Additionally, their robust build means that they can withstand high pressure operations. They also produce turbulent conditions at low flow rates, increasing the heat transfer coefficient, and hence the rate of heat transfer. There are significant disadvantages however, the two most noticeable being their high cost in proportion to heat transfer area; and the impractical lengths required for high heat duties. They also suffer from comparatively high heat losses via their large, outer shells.

The simplest form is composed of straight sections of tubing encased within the outer shell, however, alternatives such as corrugated or curved tubing conserve space while maximising heat transfer area per unit volume. They can be arranged in series or in parallel depending on the heating requirements. Typically constructed from stainless steel, spacers are inserted to retain concentricity, while the tubes are sealed with O-rings, packing, or welded depending on the operating pressures.

While both co and counter configurations are possible, the countercurrent method is more common. The preference is to pass the hot fluid through the inner tube to reduce heat losses, while the annulus is reserved for the high viscosity stream to limit the pressure drop. Beyond double stream heat exchangers, designs involving triple (or more) streams are common; alternating between hot and cool streams, thus heating/cooling the product from both sides.

== See also ==
- Heat transfer
- Heat exchanger
- Shell and tube heat exchanger
- Plate and Frame Heat Exchanger
- NTU method
