= Calandria =

Calandria may refer to:

- Calandria (nuclear reactor), large unpressurized vessel in the CANDU reactor
- La Calandria (play), a comedy of the Italian Renaissance
- Heating equipment used during brewing
- Plural form for the calandra lark, a bird species
- A thermosyphon reboiler
- A shell and tube heat exchanger

== See also ==
- Calandra (disambiguation)
- Calandrinia
