= C. Bruce Tarter =

American theoretical physicist

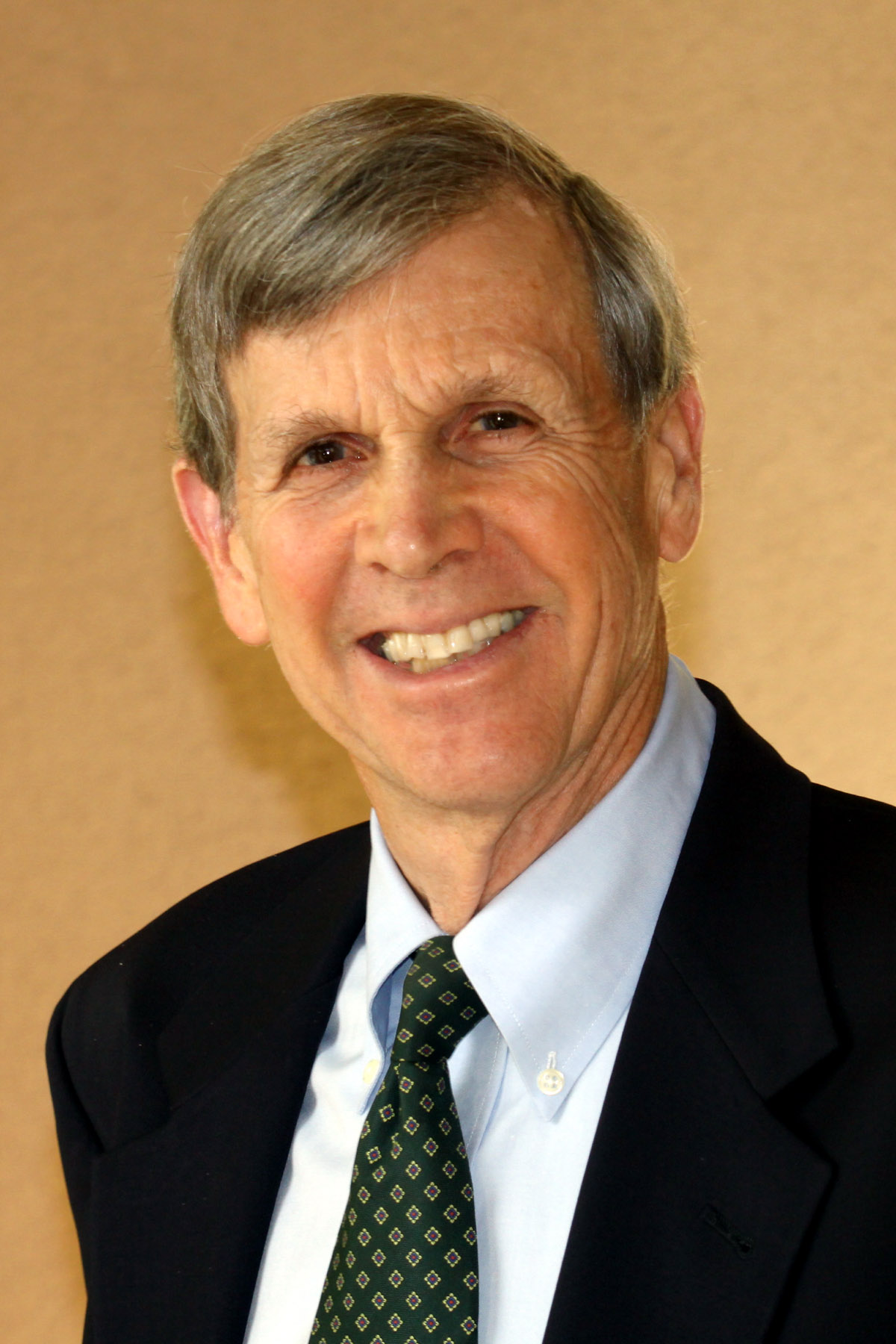

Curtis Bruce Tarter (born September 26, 1939) is an American theoretical physicist. He was the director of the Lawrence Livermore National Laboratory from 1994 to 2002. As director emeritus he recently published the first comprehensive history of the laboratory.

== Early life ==
Tarter was born in Louisville, Kentucky, on September 26, 1939. He spent the subsequent WW II years with his mother and grandparents in Evanston, Illinois. while his father served in the Army Air Corps in India and China. After the war they returned to Louisville where he attended public schools.

== Education ==
He graduated from the Massachusetts Institute of Technology with a bachelor's degree in physics in 1961. He then went to Cornell University where he received a PhD in theoretical astrophysics. His thesis adviser was Ed Salpeter and his thesis research involved both accretion disks and the interaction of X-ray sources and the surrounding environments.

== Early career ==
After a brief stint at the Aeronutronic Corporation in Newport Beach, California, he joined the Lawrence Livermore National Laboratory (LLNL) in 1967 where he would spend the remainder of his career. At LLNL he did research in astrophysics and in the fusion and nuclear weapons programs. In particular he became leader of the group involved with radiative properties of matter at high densities and temperatures and their application to various programs. His astrophysical research focused on quasars and X-ray sources, and he collaborated with colleagues at a number of universities and laboratories.

== Management positions ==
He became the head of the Theoretical Physics Division in 1978, and the deputy head of the Physics Department in 1983. He was a leader in strengthening the ties with the University of California and served on the Long Range Planning Committee that helped set the future direction of the laboratory. In 1988 he was chosen as the associate director for physics where he guided the lab's work in basic physics, space research, climate studies, and exploratory long-range research.

== Director ==
In 1994 he was selected as director of the laboratory, a position he held for eight years. His first challenge was to ensure the preservation of the laboratory and this was accomplished when President Clinton issued a proclamation stating that all three nuclear laboratories were necessary to maintain US nuclear weapons.

Over the next several years he led the laboratory in establishing its post-Cold War program, focusing primarily on science-based stockpile stewardship to replace nuclear testing. This entailed revitalizing the US supercomputer effort (in partnership with IBM) and overseeing the development of the National Ignition Facility, a three billion dollar construction project.

During he last years of his tenure as director he experienced the challenges of the Chinese espionage program, the creation of the National Nuclear Security Administration, a new government agency to oversee the laboratory's work, and the beginning of the Department of Homeland Security. His last act as director was to organize the laboratory's 50th anniversary celebration in 2002.

== Director emeritus ==
After his formal retirement he continued to represent the laboratory on a number of task forces and commissions. He served on the Defense Science Board, the board of Draper Laboratory, several National Academy of Sciences studies, and the Congressional Commission on the Strategic Posture of the United States. In parallel he began to work on the history of the laboratory through many oral interviews with those who had contributed in the past. This effort eventually led to his publishing in 2018, The American Lab: An Insider's History of the Lawrence Livermore National Laboratory.

== Awards ==
He was named a fellow of the American Physical Society, the American Association for the Advancement of Science, and the California Council on Science and Technology. He received the Roosevelt's Gold Medal Award for Science, the National Nuclear Security Administration Gold Medal, and the Secretary of Energy's Gold Award.
