= CLD chromophore =

CLD-1
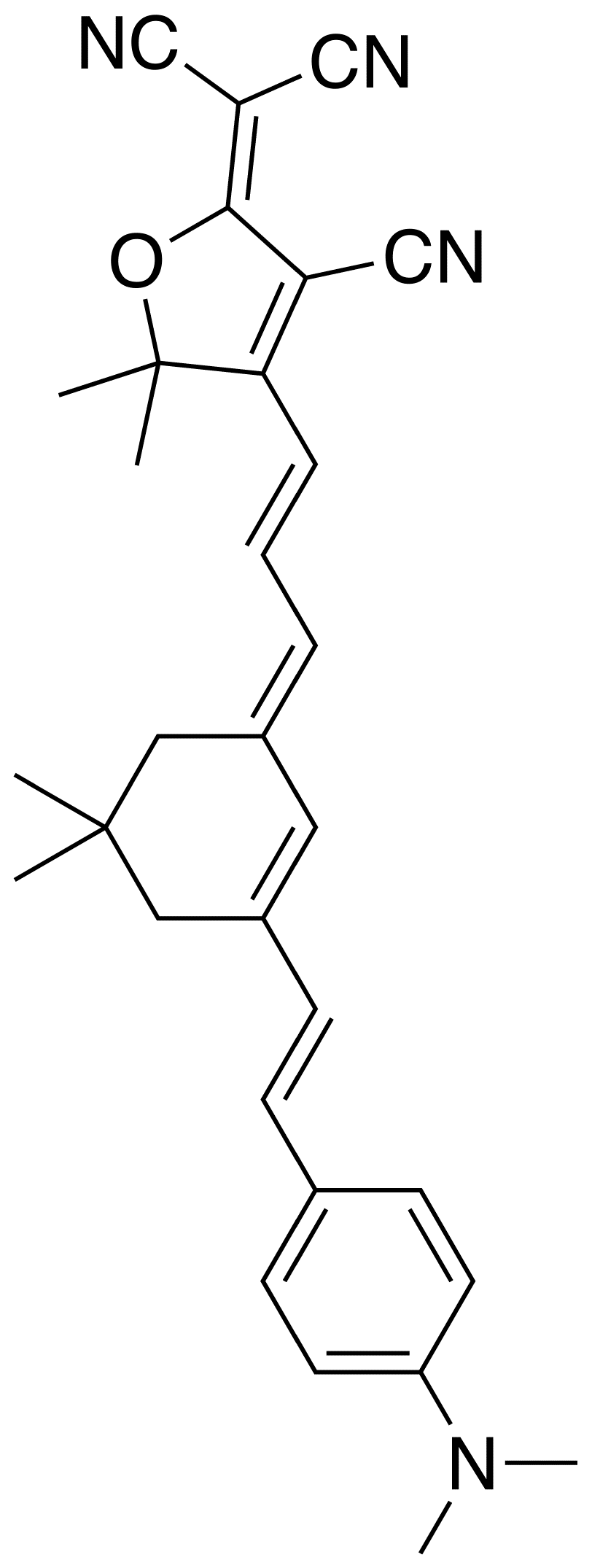

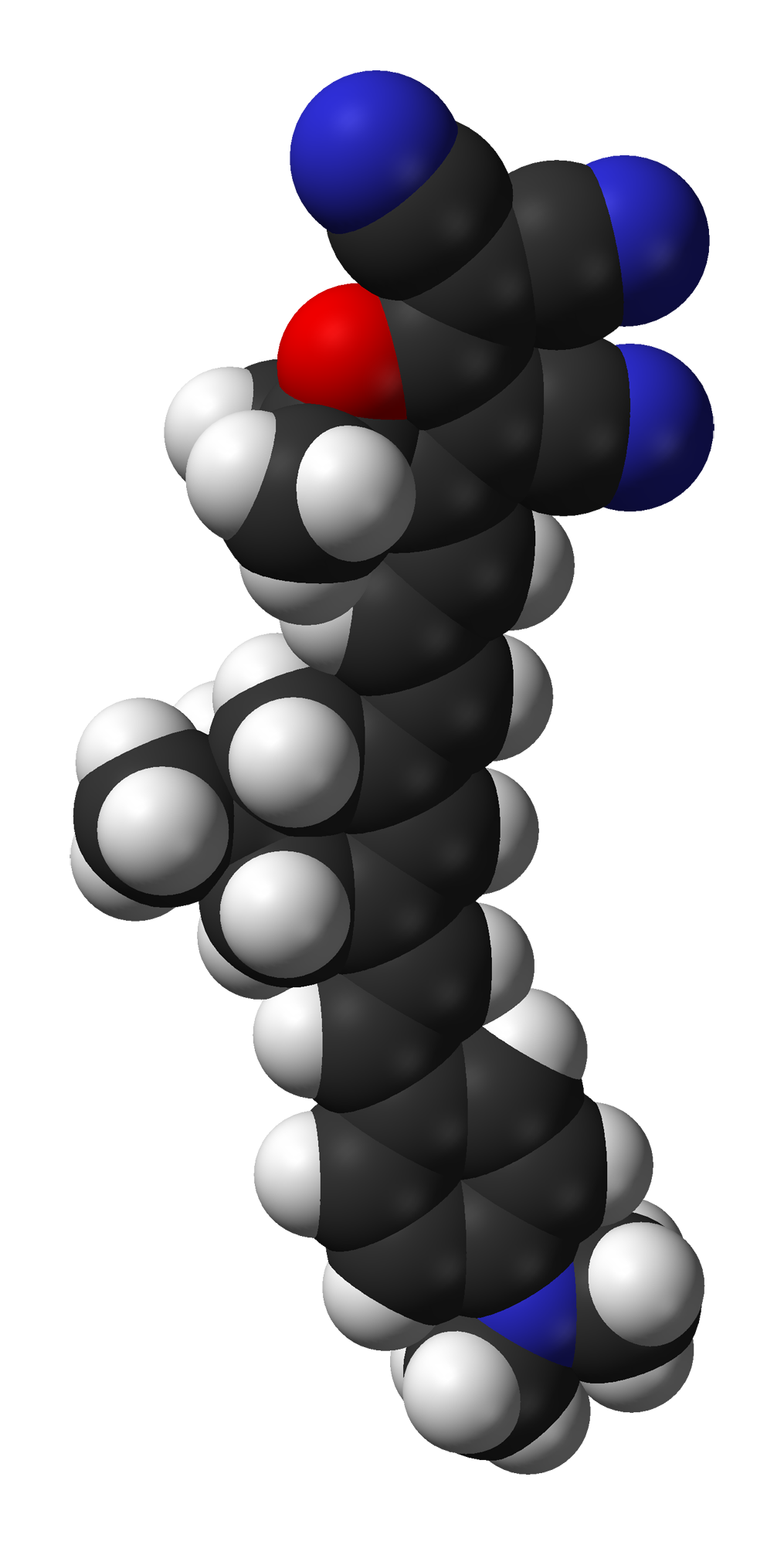

Names
- IUPAC name 2-[4-[(E,3E)-3-[3-[(E)-2-[4-[bis[2-[tert-butyl(dimethyl)silyl]oxyethyl]amino]phenyl]ethenyl]-5,5-dimethylcyclohex-2-en-1-ylidene]prop-1-enyl]-3-cyano-5,5-dimethylfuran-2-ylidene]propanedinitrile
- Other names CLD-1

Identifiers
CAS Number	CLD-1: 368874-13-9
3D model (JSmol)	CLD-1: Interactive image
ChemSpider	CLD-1: 62367708
PubChem CID	CLD-1: 89148469
CompTox Dashboard (EPA)	DTXSID201336618
- InChI: CLD-1: InChI=1S/C45H64N4O3Si2/c1-42(2,3)53(11,12)50-26-24-49(25-27-51-54(13,14)43(4,5)6)38-22-20-34(21-23-38)18-19-36-28-35(29-44(7,8)30-36)16-15-17-40-39(33-48)41(37(31-46)32-47)52-45(40,9)10/h15-23,28H,24-27,29-30H2,1-14H3/b17-15+,19-18+,35-16- Key: PYNHPJZBYGNOPU-ONTZPWRJSA-N
- SMILES: CLD-1: CC1(CC(=C/C(=C/C=C/C2=C(C(=C(C#N)C#N)OC2(C)C)C#N)/C1)/C=C/C3=CC=C(C=C3)N(CCO[Si](C)(C)C(C)(C)C)CCO[Si](C)(C)C(C)(C)C)C

Properties
Chemical formula	C_{31}H_{32}N_{4}O
Molar mass	476.61
- Except where otherwise noted, data are given for materials in their standard state (at 25 °C [77 °F], 100 kPa). verify (what is ?) Infobox references

CLD-1 is a vibrant blue dye originally synthesized for application in nonlinear electro-optics.
