= Chladni's law =

Law in quantum mechanics

Chladni's law, named after Ernst Chladni, relates the frequency of modes of vibration for flat circular surfaces with fixed center as a function of the numbers m of diametric (linear) nodes and n of radial (circular) nodes. It is stated as the equation

$$f = C (m + 2n)^p$$

where C and p are coefficients which depend on the properties of the plate.

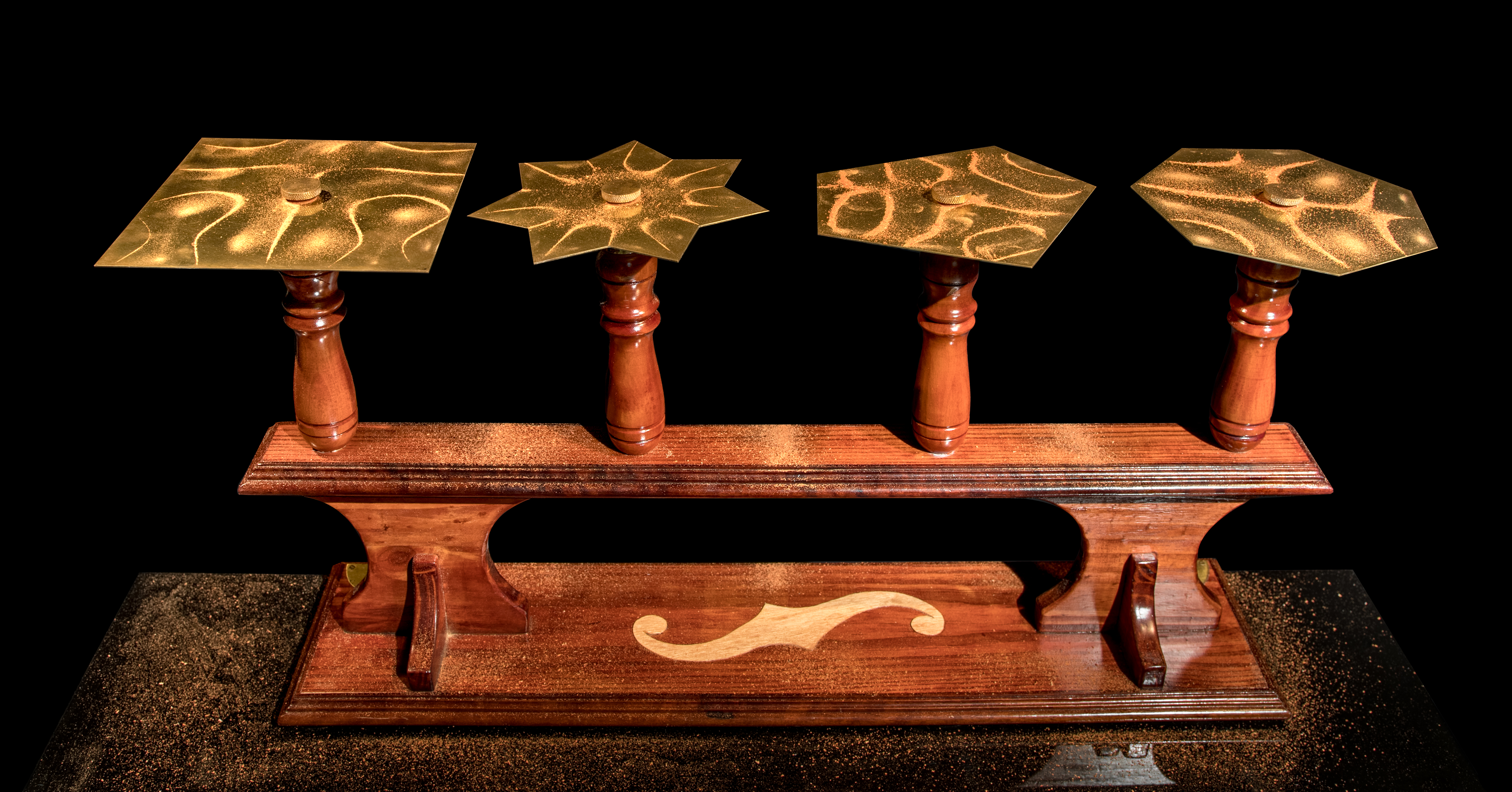
Chladni figures, used for studying vibrations

For flat circular plates, p is roughly 2, but Chladni's law can also be used to describe the vibrations of cymbals, handbells, and church bells in which case p can vary from 1.4 to 2.4. In fact, p can even vary for a single object, depending on which family of modes is being examined.
