= Convective overturn =

Model of type II supernovae

The convective overturn model of supernovae was proposed by Bethe and Wilson in 1985, and received a dramatic test with SN 1987A, and the detection of neutrinos from the explosion. The model is for type II supernovae, which take place in stars more massive than 8 solar masses.

When the iron core of a super massive star becomes heavier than electron degeneracy pressure can support, the core of the star collapses, and the iron core is compressed by gravity until nuclear densities are reached when a strong rebound sends a shock wave throughout the rest of the star and tears it apart in a large supernova explosion. The remains of this core will eventually become a neutron star. The collapse produces two reactions: one breaks apart iron nuclei into 13 helium atoms and 4 neutrons, absorbing energy; and the second produces a wave of neutrinos that form a shock wave. While all models agree there is a convective shock, there is disagreement as to how important that shock is to the supernova explosion.

In the convective overturn model, the core collapses faster and faster, exceeding the speed of sound inside the star, and producing a supersonic shock wave. This shock wave explodes outward until it stalls when it reaches the neutrinosphere, where the pressure of the star collapsing inward exceeds the pressure of the neutrinos radiating outwards. This point produces heavier elements as the neutrinos are absorbed.

The stalling of the shock wave represents the supernova problem, because once stalled, the shock wave should not be "reenergized". The prompt convection model states that the shock wave will increase the luminosity of the neutrinos produced by the core collapse, and this increase in energy will start the shock wave again. The neutron fingers model has instability near the core expel another wave of energized neutrinos which reenergizes the shock wave. The entropy convection model has matter falling inward from above the shock layer down to the gain radius, which would not increase neutrino luminosity, but would allow the shock wave to continue outwards.

All of these models exhibit convective overturn in that they rely on a convection mechanism to re-energize the stalled shock wave and complete the supernova explosion.

There are still open issues in both the convective models and in the more general core collapse model, which include not taking into account flavor mixing and mass of neutrinos, and the inability to model large explosions. Current models indicate that the collapse may occur more slowly than thought before, which would mean the shock wave would penetrate further into the upper layers of the star. The proto-neutron star boosts neutrino luminosities, and the additional neutrinos emitted help re-energize the shock wave. These changes remove some, but not all, of the supernova problem, and strengthen the idea of convection being an important factor in supernova explosions.
