= Catapult effect =

In electromagnetics, the catapult description of magnetic forces refers to when a current is passed through a loose wire in a magnetic field. The loose wire is then catapulted horizontally away from the magnetic field. This occurs due to the Lorentz force acting on the electric current in the wire due to the magnetic field.

== Implications of the catapult effect on science ==
The idea of the catapult effect is central in our day-to-day lives as it greatly contributes to our understanding of the electric motor (which we use in numerous appliances from washing machines to vacuum cleaners and cars). The catapult effect helps to explain the movement of the motor itself and is thus used widely in science.

== The left hand rule ==
The left-hand rule helps to explain why the loose wire moves as it does in the catapult effect. The left hand rule naturally takes its name from the left hand anemyl the thumb and the next two fingers. If you arrange the fingers in a three-dimensional shape so the first finger and thumb are perpendicular to one another and the second finger is perpendicular to the first aiming downwards then this is the way magnetic fields with addition of flowing current will act. The thumb represents the direction of motion. The first finger represents the direction of the magnetic field while the second finger represents the direction of the current. Therefore, as long as you know the direction of one of these three variables you will be able to predict the other two using the left hand rule. This is used in electric motors.
