= Cross-recurrence quantification =

Cross-recurrence quantification (CRQ) is a non-linear method that quantifies how similarly two observed data series unfold over time. CRQ produces measures reflecting coordination, such as how often two data series have similar values or reflect similar system states (called percentage recurrence, or %REC), among other measures.
