= Critical line (thermodynamics) =

In thermodynamics, a critical line is the higher-dimensional equivalent of a critical point. It is the locus of contiguous critical points in a phase diagram. These lines cannot occur for a single substance due to the phase rule, but they can be observed in systems with more variables, such as mixtures. Two critical lines may meet and terminate in a tricritical point.
