= Critical variable =

Thermodynamic variables associated with critical points

Critical variables are defined, for example in thermodynamics, in terms of the values of variables at the critical point.

On a PV diagram, the critical point is an inflection point. Thus:

$$\left(\frac{\partial P}{\partial V}\right)_{C}=0$$
$$\left(\frac{\partial^2 P}{\partial V^2}\right)_{C}=0$$

For the van der Waals equation, the above yields:

$$P_C=\frac{a}{27b^2}$$
$$\displaystyle{V_C=3nb}$$
$$T_C=\frac{8a}{27bR}$$
