= List of things named after Subrahmanyan Chandrasekhar =

The contents of this article is a list of things named after the Indian-American theoretical physicist Subrahmanyan Chandrasekhar.

- Chandrasekhar limit
- Chandrasekhar friction
- Chandrasekhar polarization
- Chandrasekhar waves
- Chandrasekhar–Kendall function
- Chandrasekhar's H-function
- Schönberg–Chandrasekhar limit
- Velikhov–Chandrasekhar instability
- Batchelor–Chandrasekhar equation
- Chandrasekhar–Page equations
- Chandrasekhar's white dwarf equation
- Chandrasekhar–Fermi method
- Chandrasekhar–Friedman–Schutz instability
- Chandrasekhar–Wentzel lemma
- Chandrasekhar number
- Emden–Chandrasekhar equation
- Chandrasekhar tensor
- Chandrasekhar virial equations
- Chandrasekhar's X- and Y-function
- Chandrasekhar's Variational Principle

== Others ==
- Chandra X-ray Observatory
- 1958 Chandra
- Himalayan Chandra Telescope
