= Outline of astrophysics =

Subfield of astronomy

The following outline is provided as an overview of and topical guide to astrophysics.

Astrophysics is a science that applies the methods and principles of physics and chemistry in the study of astronomical objects and phenomena including the universe. As one of the founders of the discipline, James Keeler, said, astrophysics "seeks to ascertain the nature of the heavenly bodies, rather than their positions or motions in space—what they are, rather than where they are", which is studied in celestial mechanics. Astrophysics is also used when designing and plotting courses for spacecraft.

== Description of astrophysics ==
Astrophysics can be described as all of the following:

- An academic discipline – with academic departments, curricula and degrees; national and international societies; and specialized journals.
- A scientific field (a branch of science) – a widely recognized category of specialized expertise within science, with its own terminology and nomenclature and dedicated peer‑reviewed journals.
  - A natural science – one that seeks to elucidate the rules that govern the natural world using empirical and scientific methods.
    - A branch or field of space science – a scientific discipline that involves space exploration and studies natural phenomena and physical bodies occurring in outer space.
      - A branch of astronomy – the study of celestial objects, space, and the universe as a whole.
    - A branch of physics – the fundamental science that studies matter, energy, and their interactions.
- An interdisciplinary field – a field of science that overlaps with other sciences such as physics, astronomy, planetary science, and computer science.

== Branches of astrophysics ==
- Stellar astronomy – study of star formation, physical properties, life spans, variability, stellar evolution, and end states.
  - Asteroseismology – study of oscillations in stars.
    - Helioseismology – study of the oscillations of the Sun.
  - Stellar chemistry – study of chemical compositions and abundance patterns in stars and their implications for stellar and galactic evolution.
- Solar physics – study of the Sun, its structure and activity, and its interaction with the rest of the Solar System and interstellar space.
- Celestial mechanics – Study of motion and gravitation of astronomical objects.
- Exoplanet science – detection and characterization of planets outside the Solar System and their atmospheres.
- Galactic astronomy – study of the structure and components of the Milky Way and of other galaxies.
  - Extragalactic astronomy – study of objects (mainly galaxies) outside the Milky Way, including galaxy formation and evolution.
- Physical cosmology – study of the origin, structure, evolution, and ultimate fate of the universe as a whole.
  - Quantum cosmology – study of the universe using quantum field theory and related quantum frameworks to address problems beyond classical general relativity.
    - Fractal cosmology – Models inhomogeneous universe structure on large scales.
- Gravitational-wave astronomy – study of astrophysical sources of gravitational waves and the information they carry.
- High-energy astronomy – study of astronomical objects and phenomena that involve highly energetic radiation and particles, such as active galactic nuclei, supernovae, gamma-ray bursts, quasars, and shocks.
  - Gamma-ray astronomy – study of the universe at gamma-ray wavelengths.
  - X-ray astronomy – study of astronomical objects that emit X-rays.
  - Ultraviolet astronomy – study of astronomical objects at ultraviolet wavelengths.
- Astroparticle physics – study of particles of astronomical origin (such as cosmic rays, neutrinos, and gamma rays) and their interactions with matter.
  - Cosmic ray astronomy – study of cosmic rays and their astrophysical sources.
  - Neutrino astronomy – use of neutrinos to study astrophysical sources and processes.
- Interstellar astrophysics – study of the interstellar medium, intergalactic medium, and dust.
- Atomic and molecular astrophysics – study of atomic and molecular processes in astrophysical environments, including star and planet formation.
- Plasma astrophysics – study of the properties and behavior of plasma in space and astrophysical environments.
  - Space plasma physics – Study of collisionless plasmas in space environments.
- Nuclear astrophysics – study of nuclear reactions in astrophysical environments and their role in energy generation and nucleosynthesis.
  - Nucleocosmochronology – use of the abundances of radioactive nuclides to estimate the ages of astronomical objects and the universe.
- Cosmochemistry – study of the chemical composition of matter in the universe and the processes that led to those compositions.
- Relativistic astrophysics – study of phenomena in which special and general relativity play an essential role, including gravitational waves, gravitational lensing, and black holes.
- Astrobiology – study of the origin, evolution, distribution, and future of life in the universe.
  - Astrobiophysics – study of how astrophysical phenomena influence life on Earth and hypothetically on other planets.
- Computational astrophysics – use of computational methods and numerical simulations to develop and test models of astrophysical systems.

== Universe structure and evolution ==
=== Astrophysical objects ===
- Stars and stellar remnants:
  - Main‑sequence stars
  - Giant stars and supergiants
  - Red giant – Late evolutionary stage with expanded envelope.
  - White dwarfs
  - Neutron stars
  - Black holes – region in space where the gravitational pull is so strong that nothing can escape from it.
  - Przybylski's Star – Exhibits anomalous heavy elements, challenging diffusion theories.
  - SDSS J120136.02+300305.5 – Quasar exemplifying supermassive black hole seed growth.
- Planetary systems:
  - Planets
  - Exoplanets
  - Protoplanetary disks
  - Brown dwarfs
  - Rubble pile – Aggregate structure of large asteroids from collision debris.
  - Amorphous carbonia – High-pressure carbon phase relevant to interiors of icy planets and exoplanets.
- Galaxies and large‑scale structures:
  - Dwarf galaxies
  - Spiral galaxies
    - Milky Way – the galaxy where Earth is located.
    - Alaknanda Galaxy – ancient grand‑design spiral whose unexpectedly mature structure only 1.5 billion years after the Big Bang challenges standard models of how quickly massive disk galaxies can form.
  - Galaxy clusters
  - Superclusters
  - Cosmic web

=== Astrophysical phenomena ===
- Supernovae and hypernovae
  - Supernova nucleosynthesis – Produces iron-peak elements and r-process isotopes.
  - Iron peak – Nucleosynthesis endpoint around iron group elements in supernovae.
  - Nucleosynthesis – process by which elements are formed through nuclear reactions in stars and in the early universe.
- Gamma-ray bursts
- Active galactic nuclei and quasars
  - SDSS J120136.02+300305.5 – Quasar exemplifying supermassive black hole seed growth.
- Accretion (astrophysics)
  - Accretion disks
- Astrophysical jets and outflows
- Stellar flares and coronal mass ejections
- Pulsars and magnetars
- Gravitational lensing – bending of light from a distant object due to the gravitational field of a massive object between it and the observer.
- Cosmic microwave background radiation
  - Axis of evil (cosmology) – CMB alignment anomaly challenging isotropy assumptions.
- Dark matter – form of matter that does not emit, absorb, or reflect light, inferred from its gravitational effects. and dark energy – hypothetical form of energy that permeates space and drives the accelerated expansion of the universe.
- Reionization – Epoch when first stars ionized intergalactic hydrogen.
- Planck scale – Fundamental limit where quantum gravity dominates early universe.
- Causal dynamical triangulation – Quantum gravity approach simulating universe emergence at Planck scales.

==== Chemical evolution ====
- Abundance of the chemical elements – Quantifies elemental distributions in the universe.
- Metallicity distribution function – Statistical tool for galactic chemical evolution.
- S-process – Slow neutron capture producing heavy elements in AGB stars.
- P-nuclei – Rare isotopes synthesized in supernovae.

==== Stellar & solar signatures ====
- Stellar pulsation – Oscillations revealing stellar interiors via asteroseismology.
  - Frequency separation – Asteroseismic diagnostic of stellar core rotation.
- Solar radio emission – Emission from solar corona tracing magnetic activity.
- Standard solar model – Predicts neutrino fluxes testing particle physics.

==== Interstellar diagnostics ====
- Photodissociation region – Interfaces where UV photons dissociate molecules in nebulae.
- X-factor – Converts CO emission to molecular hydrogen mass.
- Radio Recombination Lines – Emission from ionized nebulae tracing temperature and density.
- Strömgren integral – Computes H II region size around hot stars.
- Zanstra method – Determines nebula electron density from emission lines.
- Interstellar medium – matter that exists in the space between stars in a galaxy.

==== High-energy signatures ====
- Extragalactic cosmic ray – High-energy particles from distant galaxies probing acceleration sites.
- Cosmic ray – high-energy radiation from outer space that may consist of protons or atomic nuclei.

==== Computational models ====
- Illustris project – Large-scale hydrodynamic simulation of galaxy formation.
- UniverseMachine – Empirical model for galaxy property evolution.

=== Galaxy structure relations ===
- De Vaucouleurs's law – Empirical profile for elliptical galaxy surface brightness.
- Sérsic profile – Generalizes de Vaucouleurs' law for galaxy morphologies.
- Jaffe profile – Analytic model for elliptical galaxy density profiles.
- M–sigma relation – Correlation between black hole mass and galaxy bulge velocity dispersion.
- Sigma-D relation – Links galaxy thickness to velocity dispersion.
- Virgocentric flow – Radial motions in Local Group galaxies.

== Technical foundations ==
=== Methods and techniques ===
- Observational astronomy – collection and analysis of electromagnetic radiation and other messengers from astronomical sources.
  - Photometry – measurement of the brightness of astronomical sources in different wavelength bands.
  - K correction – Adjusts galaxy magnitudes for cosmological redshift effects.
  - Photographic magnitude – Historical magnitude system for archival comparisons.
- Astronomical spectroscopy – study of astronomy using spectroscopy to measure the spectrum of electromagnetic radiation emitted by celestial objects.
  - Zeeman–Doppler imaging – Maps stellar surface magnetic fields spectropolarimetrically.
  - Compton scattering – Dominant interaction of high-energy photons with electrons in hot plasmas.
  - Doppler effect – change in frequency or wavelength of a wave in relation to an observer moving relative to the wave source.
    - Differential Doppler effect – Fine velocity mapping in expanding supernova remnants.
- Astrometry – precise measurement of positions, motions, and distances of astronomical objects.
- Radiative transfer – modeling of the propagation of radiation through matter in astrophysical environments; description of the transport of radiation through a medium.
  - Grey atmosphere – Simplified stellar atmosphere model assuming constant opacity.
  - Optical depth (astrophysics) – Measure of photon mean free path in media.
  - Source function – Ratio of emission to absorption coefficients in atmospheres.
- Magnetohydrodynamics – study of the dynamics of electrically conducting fluids such as plasmas in astrophysical contexts.
  - Magnetogravity wave – Coupled Alfvén-gravity waves in stellar interiors.
  - Wouthuysen–Field coupling – Enables 21cm absorption in early universe IGM.
- Numerical analysis and computer simulation in astrophysics – use of algorithms and simulations to model complex systems such as galaxy formation or stellar interiors.
  - Press–Schechter formalism – Predicts dark matter halo mass function from Gaussian fluctuations.
  - Sheth–Tormen approximation – Improves halo mass function predictions.
  - Zeldovich approximation – First-order perturbation for large-scale structure growth.
- Gravitational-wave detection techniques – methods used to detect and analyze gravitational waves.
  - Gravitational self-force – Backreaction on particles orbiting black holes.
  - Regge–Wheeler–Zerilli equations – Perturbation equations for black hole spacetimes.
- Multi-messenger astronomy – coordinated use of electromagnetic radiation, gravitational waves, neutrinos, and cosmic rays to study astrophysical sources.
  - Peryton (astronomy) – Fast radio burst-like signals from terrestrial interference, refining SETI searches.
- Hydrostatic equilibrium – balance between inward gravitational force and outward pressure in astrophysical objects such as stars.
- Jeans instability – criterion for gravitational collapse of a gas cloud.
  - Jeans's theorem – Phase-space density conservation in collisionless stellar dynamics.
  - Gravitational compression – Initial collapse trigger in star formation.
- Polarization – property of waves that describes the orientation of their oscillations.
  - Chandrasekhar polarization – Calculates scattering-induced polarization in stellar atmospheres.
- Standard candle – astronomical object with known luminosity used to measure distances in astronomy.
  - Phillips relationship – Standardizes Type Ia supernova light curves for cosmology.

=== Key models and profiles ===
- Dark matter halo and galaxy profiles
  - Navarro–Frenk–White profile – CDM simulation-derived dark matter halo profile.
  - Einasto profile – Dark matter halo density model fitting simulations and observations.
  - Osipkov–Merritt model – Anisotropic stellar distribution function for galaxies.
  - Plummer model – Softened potential for simulating star clusters.
- Relativistic astrophysics models
  - Nordtvedt effect – Lunar orbit test of strong equivalence principle.
  - Geodetic effect (aka De Sitter effect) – Relativistic clock rate variation in gravitational fields.
  - Vaidya metric – Describing radiating black hole spacetimes.
  - Weyl's postulate – Hypersurface-orthogonality in cosmological models.
  - White hole – Hypothetical time-reverse of black holes in general relativity.
  - Black hole greybody factors – Correct absorption/emission spectra of black holes beyond Hawking radiation idealization.
- Phenomenological models
  - Blast wave – Describes shock expansion in supernovae and gamma-ray bursts.
  - Ejecta – Material expelled in supernovae, shaping galactic chemical evolution.
  - Hubble–Reynolds law – Empirical relation for supernova remnant evolution.
  - Pulsed accretion – Episodic mass buildup in protostars driving outflows.
  - Superluminal motion – Apparent faster-than-light speeds in relativistic jets.
  - Relativistic beaming – Boosts emission in jets from black holes and pulsars.
  - Supra-arcade downflows – Plasma flows in post-flare arcades.
  - Gravitational lensing formalism – Mathematical framework mapping mass distributions via light deflection.
  - Virbhadra–Ellis lens equation – Exact gravitational lensing for strong fields.
  - Miyake event – Extreme solar proton events recorded in tree rings, informing cosmic ray history.

=== Instabilities, limits, and dynamics ===
- Quark matter – hypothetical phase of matter consisting primarily of quarks.
- Universe – all existing matter, energy, planets, stars, galaxies, and the space between them.
  - Angular momentum problem – Addresses conservation challenges in star and planet formation from collapsing clouds.
- B2FH paper – Seminal work on stellar nucleosynthesis processes producing elements beyond iron.

==== Plasma astrophysics ====
- Dusty plasma – Plasma with dust grains, common in stellar envelopes and nebulae.
- Plasma parameters – Dimensionless numbers characterizing astrophysical plasmas.
- Biermann battery – Mechanism generating magnetic fields in cosmic plasmas during structure formation.
- Firehose instability – Plasma instability in cosmic ray streaming regions.
- Magnetic helicity – Topological invariant conserved in MHD evolution of solar coronae.
- Magnetic mirror point – Reflection site for charged particles in magnetospheres.
- Woltjer's theorem – Conserves helicity in pulsar magnetospheres.
- Plasma physics – study of charged particles and fluids interacting with self‑consistent electric and magnetic fields.
  - Critical ionization velocity – Threshold limiting plasma ionization in cosmic shocks and aurorae.
  - Dissociative recombination – Key process in cooling primordial gas for star formation.
  - Hydrogen anion – Negative ion affecting opacity in cool stellar atmospheres.
  - Collision-induced absorption and emission – Spectral features in dense planetary and stellar atmospheres.

==== Stellar structure limits ====
- Chandrasekhar limit – Critical mass (~1.4 solar masses) determining white dwarf stability before supernova.
- Lane–Emden equation – Polytrope equation solving stellar structure.
- Polytrope – Self-similar stellar models approximating interiors.
- Schönberg–Chandrasekhar limit – Maximum hydrogen-depleted core mass in red giants.
- Tolman–Oppenheimer–Volkoff equation – Relativistic hydrostatic equilibrium for neutron stars.
- Tolman–Oppenheimer–Volkoff limit – Neutron star maximum mass (~2 solar masses).

==== Stellar dynamics and instabilities ====
- Chandrasekhar's variational principle – Optimizes stellar structure models under physical constraints.
- Chandrasekhar–Fermi method – Estimates interstellar magnetic fields from starlight polarization.
- Chandrasekhar–Friedman–Schutz instability – Instability in rotating relativistic stars leading to collapse.
- Chandrasekhar–Kendall function – Describes MHD equilibria in astrophysical jets and accretion disks.
- Chandrasekhar potential energy tensor – Tensor formalism for gravitational stability in self-gravitating systems.
- Darwin–Radau equation – Relates stellar density to moment of inertia for evolution tracking.
- Dirichlet's ellipsoidal problem – Equilibrium figures for self-gravitating rotating fluids.
- Jacobi ellipsoid – Triaxial equilibrium shape for rotating self-gravitating masses.
- Maclaurin spheroid – Oblate equilibrium figure for uniformly rotating fluids.
- Toomre's stability criterion – Prevents gravitational collapse in galactic disks.
- Bahcall–Wolf cusp – Predicted density profile of stars around supermassive black holes.
- Dynamical friction – Drag on massive objects moving through stellar/gas mediums.
- Mass segregation (astronomy) – Heavier stars sinking to cluster centers via dynamics.
- Mass deficit – Core collapse signature in globular clusters.
- Epicyclic frequency – Orbital oscillation frequency in galactic potentials.
- Rossby wave instability – Triggers coronal mass ejections in stellar dynamos.
- Richtmyer–Meshkov instability – Shock-driven mixing in supernova interiors.
- Shock waves in astrophysics – Accelerate cosmic rays in supernova remnants.
- Convective overturn – Global circulation in stellar convection zones affecting mixing and evolution.
- Champagne flow model – Explains star formation triggering in molecular clouds via supersonic outflows.
- Gas torus – Circumplanetary gas rings in planet formation models.
- Eddington number – Ratio gauging radiation pressure role in massive star stability.
- Entropy (astrophysics) – Measure of disorder in stellar interiors driving convection.
- Moment of inertia factor – Normalizes stellar rotation rates for evolution models.
- Photo-meson – Production process for high-energy neutrinos in cosmic rays.
- Gravitational scattering – Encounters shaping stellar velocities in clusters.

==== Stellar evolution ====
Stellar evolution – process by which a star changes over time.

- Hayashi track – Cooling path of pre-main-sequence stars on HR diagram.
- Applegate mechanism – Explains long-term brightness variations in binary stars via angular momentum redistribution.
- Chaotic rotation – Irregular tumbling of asteroids and moons due to impacts and resonances.
- Rotational Brownian motion (astronomy) – Random torques randomizing small body spins.

== Instruments and observatories ==
- Optical and infrared telescopes
- Radio telescopes and interferometric arrays
- Space telescopes and space‑based observatories
- X-ray telescopes and gamma-ray telescopes
- Gravitational‑wave observatories
- Neutrino detectors
- Major observatories and facilities:
  - Hubble Space Telescope
  - James Webb Space Telescope
  - Very Large Telescope
  - Atacama Large Millimeter Array
  - Chandra X-ray Observatory
  - Fermi Gamma-ray Space Telescope
  - Calorimetric Electron Telescope – Instrument measuring cosmic ray electrons to probe astrophysical accelerators.
  - ARIANNA Experiment – Detector for ultra-high-energy neutrinos from cosmic sources like active galactic nuclei.
  - Compton telescope – Images gamma-ray sources like pulsars and black hole binaries.

== Dark matter and gravity alternatives ==
- 2cDM model of dark matter – Two-component BSM theory proposing distinct particle species to address small-scale structure issues in cosmology, but requiring parameter fine-tuning.
- AQUAL – Modified gravity theory rivaling dark matter in explaining galactic dynamics.
- Dark fluid – Unified model combining dark matter and energy behaviors.
- Modified Newtonian dynamics – Empirical law replacing dark matter for galaxy rotations.
- Haloscope (physics) – Detector for axion dark matter conversion in magnetic fields.
- Bi-scalar tensor vector gravity – Alternative gravity theory addressing cosmic acceleration without dark energy.
- Gauge vector–tensor gravity – Modified gravity resolving galactic rotation anomalies.
- Scalar–tensor–vector gravity – MOND-like theory explaining galaxy dynamics.
- Tensor–vector–scalar gravity – Relativistic MOND variant fitting observations.
- Zeldovich equation of state – Degenerate matter model for compact objects.
- Oppenheimer–Snyder model – Dust collapse solution forming black holes.

== History of astrophysics ==
- History of astrophysics
- History of astronomy
- History of spectroscopy
- History of stellar classification
- History of radio astronomy
- Timeline of gravitational physics and relativity
- Timeline of knowledge about galaxies, clusters of galaxies, and large-scale structure
- Timeline of white dwarfs, neutron stars, and supernovae
- History of physical cosmology

== Astrophysics organizations ==
- International Astronomical Union
- American Astronomical Society
- Royal Astronomical Society
- European Southern Observatory
- Astrophysics Research Institute
- Jodrell Bank Centre for Astrophysics
- Max Planck Institute for Astrophysics

== Astrophysics publications ==
- The Astrophysical Journal
- Monthly Notices of the Royal Astronomical Society
- Astronomy and Astrophysics
- Annual Review of Astronomy and Astrophysics
- Astronomy & Geophysics
- Astrophysics and Space Science
- Research in Astronomy and Astrophysics

== Astrophysics awards ==
- Dannie Heineman Prize for Astrophysics
- Shaw Prize in Astronomy
- Gruber Prize in Cosmology
- Kavli Prize in Astrophysics
- Breakthrough Prize in Fundamental Physics (for astrophysics‑related work)

== Persons influential in astrophysics ==
- Alastair G. W. Cameron
- Carl Sagan
- Riccardo Giacconi
- Viktor Ambartsumian
- Subrahmanyan Chandrasekhar
- Edwin Hubble
- Cecilia Payne-Gaposchkin
- Vera Rubin
- Stephen Hawking
- List of Russian astronomers and astrophysicists

=== Astrophysics scholars ===
- Angioletta Coradini
- Gustav Eberhard
- J. Marvin Herndon
- Ofer Lahav
- Donald Howard Menzel
- Carl Pennypacker

== See also ==
- Outline of astronomy
- Outline of physics
- Outline of space science
- Chondritic uniform reservoir – Model for solar system bulk composition from meteoritic evidence.
- Compact objects – Densely packed stellar remnants including white dwarfs, neutron stars, and black holes.
- Direct numerical simulation – High-fidelity computational modeling of astrophysical fluids without subgrid approximations.
- Orbital mechanics – Application of mechanics to orbital trajectories of celestial bodies.
