= List of hydrodynamic instabilities named after people =

This is a list of hydrodynamic and plasma instabilities named after people (eponymous instabilities).

Instability	Field	Named for
Benjamin–Feir instability	Surface gravity waves	T. Brooke Benjamin and Jim E. Feir
Buneman instability	Plasma physics	Oscar Buneman
Chandrasekhar–Donnelly instability	Taylor-Couette instability of Helium II	Subrahmanyan Chandrasekhar and R.J. Donnelly
Chandrasekhar–Friedman–Schutz instability	Instability of rotating self-gravitating mass due to gravitational radiation damping	Subrahmanyan Chandrasekhar, John L. Friedman and Bernard F. Schutz
Cherenkov instability	Plasma physics	Pavel Alekseevich Cherenkov
Chromo-Weibel instability	Plasma physics	E. S. Weibel
Crow instability	Aerodynamics	S. C. Crow
Darrieus–Landau instability	Stability of propagating flame	Georges Jean Marie Darrieus and Lev Landau
Dean instability	Stability of flow in a curved pipe	William Reginald Dean
D'yakov–Kontorovich instability	Stability of a plane shock	S. P. D'yakov and Victor M. Kontorovich
Faraday instability	Vibrating fluid surfaces	M. Faraday
Farley–Buneman instability	Plasma instability	Donald T. Farley and Oscar Buneman
Görtler instability	Stability of flow along a concave boundary layer	H. Görtler
Holmboe instability	Stratified shear flows	Jørgen Holmboe
Jeans instability	Stability of interstellar gas clouds	James Jeans
Kelvin–Helmholtz instability	Stability of shearing flow	Lord Kelvin and Hermann von Helmholtz
Kruskal–Shafranov instability	Plasma physics	Martin David Kruskal and Vitaly Shafranov
Peratt instability	Plasma physics	Anthony Peratt
Plateau–Rayleigh instability	Stability of jets and drops	Joseph Plateau and Lord Rayleigh
Rayleigh–Bénard instability	Natural convection, Rayleigh–Bénard convection	Lord Rayleigh and Henri Bénard
Rayleigh–Taylor instability	Instability created by density stratification	Lord Rayleigh and Geoffrey Ingram Taylor
Richtmyer–Meshkov instability	Plasma physics, Astrophysics	R. D. Richtmyer and E. E. Meshkov
Roberts–Stewartson instability	Instability of rotating self-gravitating mass due to viscosity	Paul H. Roberts and Keith Stewartson
Saffman–Taylor instability	Flow in porous medium	Philip Saffman and Geoffrey Ingram Taylor
Taylor–Caulfield instability	Stratified shear flows	Geoffrey Ingram Taylor and Colm-cille P. Caulfield
Taylor–Couette instability	Flow in rotating cylinder	Geoffrey Ingram Taylor and Maurice Marie Alfred Couette
Tollmien–Schlichting instability	Wave instability in shearing flows	Walter Tollmien and Hermann Schlichting
Velikhov instability	Plasma physics (non-equilibrium MHD)	Evgeny Velikhov
Velikhov-Chandrasekhar instability	Stability of rotating fluid in magnetic field	Evgeny Velikhov and Subrahmanyan Chandrasekhar
Weibel instability	Plasma physics	E. S. Weibel

== See also ==
- Eponym
- List of fluid flows named after people
- Instability
- Hydrodynamic stability
- Scientific phenomena named after people
