= Chandresekhar =

Chandrasekhar may refer to:

== People ==
- B. S. Chandrasekhar (born 1945), Indian cricketer
- Jay Chandrasekhar (born 1968), American comedian
- Nagathihalli Chandrashekhar, Indian author and film director
- S. A. Chandrasekhar, Indian film director active 1971–present
- Sripati Chandrasekhar (1918–2001), Indian politician
- Subrahmanyan Chandrasekhar (1910–1995), Punjab-born American astrophysicist and 1983 Nobel Prize in Physics winner
- V. B. Chandrasekhar (born 1961), Indian cricketer

== Physics ==
- Chandrasekhar limit, maximum nonrotating mass that can be supported against gravitational collapse by electron degeneracy pressure, named for Subrahmanyan Chandrasekhar, who discovered and improved upon the accuracy of the calculation in 1930
- Chandrasekhar number, a dimensionless quantity used in magnetoconvection to represent ratio of the Lorentz force to the viscous force, named after Subrahmanyan Chandrasekhar

== See also ==
- Chandra Shekhar (1927–2007), Indian politician who served as prime minister of India for seven months
