= PKS 0426−380 =

Blazar in the constellation Caelum

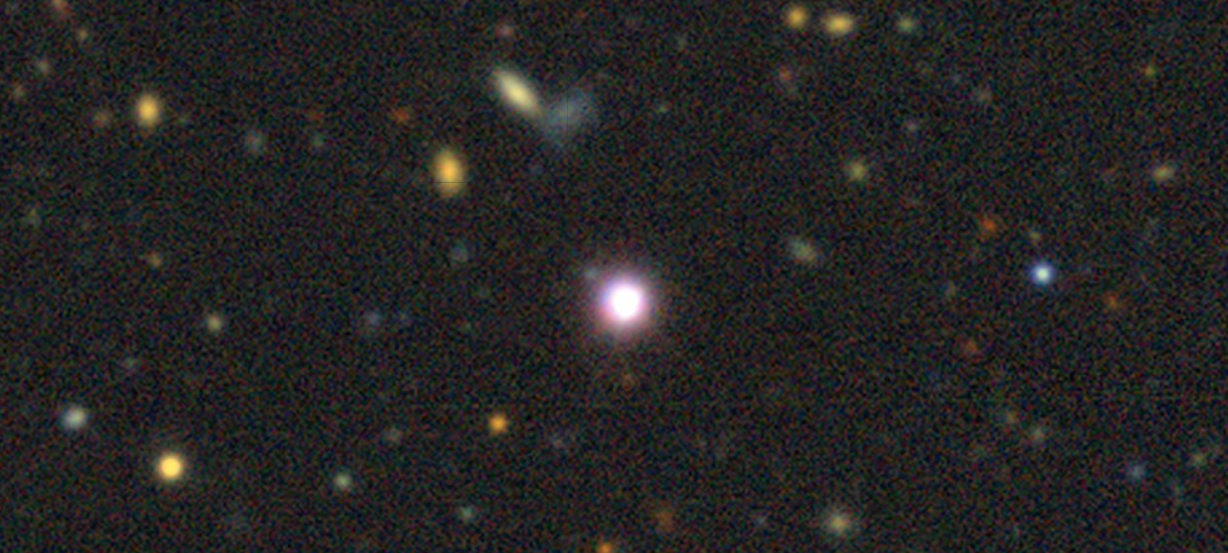
- The blazar PKS 0426−380

Observation data (J2000.0 epoch)
- Constellation: Caelum
- Right ascension: 04^{h} 28^{m} 40.424^{s}
- Declination: −37° 56′ 19.580″
- Redshift: 1.110000
- Heliocentric radial velocity: 332,770 km/s
- Distance: 8.300 Gly
- Apparent magnitude (V): 19.0
- Apparent magnitude (B): 18.96

Characteristics
- Type: FSRQ BL LAC

Other designations
- 2MASS J04284041−3756195, LEDA 2823953, PKS J0428−3756, NVSS J042840−375619, RX J0428.6−3756, AT20G J042840.37−375619.3, SUMSS J042840−375619, WISEA J042840.41−375619.6, PMN J0428−3756, VSOP J0428−3756

PKS 0426−380 is a blazar located in the southern constellation of Caelum. The redshift of the object is (z) 1.110, meaning it is 8.3 billion light-years away from Earth and it was first discovered as a strong radio source in 1981 by astronomers conducting the Very Large Array (VLA) survey. The radio spectrum of the object is classified flat making it a flat-spectrum radio quasar but also referred to as a BL Lacerate object in literature.

== Description ==
PKS 0426−380 has been described having broad emission lines shown visible but in an low-emission state. The object is also noted to be variable on the electromagnetic spectrum, undergoing several flaring episodes with its flux rising by orders of magnitude. It has two gamma-ray flares, detected by Fermi Gamma-ray Space Telescope on January 4, 2010 and 17 December 2012.

The host galaxy of PKS 0426−380 is described as a luminous elliptical galaxy with a magnitude of -26.65, and referred to as a microlensing candidate based on a detection of an absorbing galaxy at the redshift of (z) 0.559. It is also said to be a low-polarized quasar since its optical polarization is less than 3%.

The object has a compact radio structure. Observations made by the VLA have found it has a compact core with an extension by 2.7 arcseconds with a position angle of -24°. This core also has a temperature brightness of 7 × 10^{11} Kelvin. The jet structure of the object is also compact, with a short jet pointing northwest based on high resolution imaging.

PKS 0426−380 is known to be a very-high-energy emitter. According to observations by the Fermi Gamma-ray Space Telescope, which detected it in an active flaring phase, it is known to emit several gamma-ray photons at high energies of 134 and 122 GeV, one of them being associated with the object making it the most distant of its kind observed. It was also noted no GeV flux increased on the day of the very-high-energy detection although its spectral index was found hardening significantly. Observations also found most of the flare emitting regions are located within the area between the supermassive black hole and torus.

PKS 0426−380 is an astrophysical neutrino candidate. Dubbed IceCube 190504A, the event was found within the 90% error ellipse from the object and was shown to have an average flux measuring 1.97 ± 0.41 × 10^{−7} ph cm^{−2}. This occurred while PKS 0426−380 was in a faint gamma-ray state.

In 2017, PKS 0426−380 was found to display a possible quasi-periodicity signal. A further study in 2023, confirmed the signal was caused by quasi-periodic oscillations with a period 12.2 years based on evaluation of its power spectrum signal from its source with the red-noise background. These detections of quasi-periodic oscillations suggests PKS 0426−380 might have a binary supermassive black hole in its center with a mass of 3 × 10^{8} M_{☉} and a separation gap of 0.0029 parsecs.
