= Generalized Stokes theorem =

Statement about integration on manifolds

In vector calculus and differential geometry the generalized Stokes theorem (sometimes with apostrophe as Stokes' theorem or Stokes's theorem), also called the Stokes–Cartan theorem, is a statement about the integration of differential forms on manifolds, which both simplifies and generalizes several theorems from vector calculus. In particular, the fundamental theorem of calculus is the special case where the manifold is a line segment, Green’s theorem and Stokes' theorem are the cases of a surface in $\R^2$ or $\R^3$, and the divergence theorem is the case of a volume in $\R^3$. Hence, the theorem is sometimes referred to as the fundamental theorem of multivariate calculus.

Stokes' theorem says that the integral of a differential form $\omega$ over the boundary $\partial\Omega$ of some orientable manifold $\Omega$ is equal to the integral of its exterior derivative $d\omega$ over the whole of $\Omega$, i.e.,
$$\int_{\partial \Omega} \omega = \int_\Omega \,d\omega\,.$$

Stokes' theorem was formulated in its modern form by Élie Cartan in 1945, following earlier work on the generalization of the theorems of vector calculus by Vito Volterra, Édouard Goursat, and Henri Poincaré.

This modern form of Stokes' theorem is a vast generalization of a classical result that Lord Kelvin communicated to George Stokes in a letter dated July 2, 1850. Stokes set the theorem as a question on the 1854 Smith's Prize exam, which led to the result bearing his name. It was first published by Hermann Hankel in 1861. This classical case relates the surface integral of the curl of a vector field $\textbf{F}$ over a surface (that is, the flux of $\text{curl}\,\textbf{F}$) in Euclidean three-space to the line integral of the vector field over the surface boundary.

== Introduction ==
The second fundamental theorem of calculus states that the integral of a function $f$ over the interval $[a,b]$ can be calculated by finding an antiderivative $F$ of $f$:
$$\int_a^b f(x)\,dx = F(b) - F(a)\,.$$

Stokes' theorem is a vast generalization of this theorem in the following sense.

- By the choice of $F$, $\textstyle \frac{dF}{dx}=f(x)$. In the parlance of differential forms, this is saying that $f(x)\,dx$ is the exterior derivative of the 0-form, i.e. function, $F$: in other words, that $dF=f\,dx$. The general Stokes theorem applies to higher degree differential forms $\omega$ instead of just 0-forms such as $F$.
- A closed interval $[a,b]$ is a simple example of a one-dimensional manifold with boundary. Its boundary is the set consisting of the two points $a$ and $b$. Integrating $f$ over the interval may be generalized to integrating forms on a higher-dimensional manifold. Two technical conditions are needed: the manifold has to be orientable, and the form has to be compactly supported in order to give a well-defined integral.
- The two points $a$ and $b$ form the boundary of the closed interval. More generally, Stokes' theorem applies to oriented manifolds $M$ with boundary. The boundary $\partial M$ of $M$ is itself a manifold and inherits a natural orientation from that of $M$. For example, the natural orientation of the interval gives an orientation of the two boundary points. Intuitively, $a$ inherits the opposite orientation as $b$, as they are at opposite ends of the interval. So, "integrating" $F$ over two boundary points $a$, $b$ is taking the difference $F(b)-F(a)$.

In even simpler terms, one can consider the points as boundaries of curves, that is as 0-dimensional boundaries of 1-dimensional manifolds. So, just as one can find the value of an integral ($f\,dx=dF$) over a 1-dimensional manifold ($[a,b]$) by considering the anti-derivative ($F$) at the 0-dimensional boundaries ($\{a,b\}$), one can generalize the fundamental theorem of calculus, with a few additional caveats, to deal with the value of integrals ($d\omega$) over $n$-dimensional manifolds ($\Omega$) by considering the antiderivative ($\omega$) at the $(n-1)$-dimensional boundaries ($\partial\Omega$) of the manifold.

So the fundamental theorem reads:
$$\int_{[a, b]} f(x)\,dx = \int_{[a, b]} \,dF = \int_{\partial[a, b]} \,F = \int_{\{a\}^- \cup \{b\}^+} F = F(b) - F(a)\,.$$

== Formulation for smooth manifolds with boundary ==
Let $\Omega$ be an oriented smooth manifold of dimension $n$ with boundary and let $\alpha$ be a smooth $n$-differential form that is compactly supported on $\Omega$. First, suppose that $\alpha$ is compactly supported in the domain of a single, oriented coordinate chart $\{U,\varphi\}$. In this case, we define the integral of $\alpha$ over $\Omega$ as
$$\int_\Omega \alpha = \int_{\varphi(U)} (\varphi^{-1})^* \alpha\,,$$
i.e., via the pullback of $\alpha$ to $\R^n$.

More generally, the integral of $\alpha$ over $\Omega$ is defined as follows: Let $\{\psi_i\}$ be a partition of unity associated with a locally finite cover $\{U_i,\varphi_i\}$ of (consistently oriented) coordinate charts, then define the integral
$$\int_\Omega \alpha \equiv \sum_i \int_{U_i} \psi_i \alpha\,,$$
where each term in the sum is evaluated by pulling back to $\R^n$ as described above. This quantity is well-defined; that is, it does not depend on the choice of the coordinate charts, nor the partition of unity.

The generalized Stokes theorem reads:

Theorem (Stokes–Cartan)—Let $\Omega$ be an oriented $n$-dimensional manifold-with-boundary, where $\partial \Omega$ is given the induced orientation, and let $\omega$ be a smooth $(n-1)$-form with compact support on $\Omega$. Then
$$\int_{\Omega} d\omega = \int_{\partial\Omega} \omega.$$

Here $d$ is the exterior derivative, which is defined using the manifold structure only. The right-hand side is sometimes written as $\oint_{\partial\Omega} \omega$ to stress the fact that the $(n-1)$-manifold $\partial\Omega$ has no boundary. (Note: For mathematicians this fact is known, therefore the circle is redundant and often omitted. However, one should keep in mind here that in thermodynamics, where frequently expressions as $\oint_W\{d_\text{total}U\}$ appear (wherein the total derivative, see below, should not be confused with the exterior one), the integration path $W$ is a one-dimensional closed line on a much higher-dimensional manifold. That is, in a thermodynamic application, where $U$ is a function of the temperature $\alpha_1=T$, the volume $\alpha_2=V$, and the electrical polarization $\alpha_3=P$ of the sample, one has $$\{d_\text{total}U\} = \sum_{i=1}^3\frac{\partial U}{\partial\alpha_i}\,d\alpha_i\,,$$ and the circle is really necessary, e.g. if one considers the differential consequences of the integral postulate $$\oint_W\,\{d_\text{total}U\}\, \stackrel{!}{=}\,0\,.$$) (This fact is also an implication of Stokes' theorem, since for a given smooth $n$-dimensional manifold $\Omega$, application of the theorem twice gives $\int_{\partial(\partial \Omega)}\omega=\int_\Omega d(d\omega)=0$ for any $(n-2)$-form $\omega$, which implies that $\partial(\partial\Omega)=\emptyset$.) The right-hand side of the equation is often used to formulate integral laws; the left-hand side then leads to equivalent differential formulations (see below).

The theorem is often used in situations where $\Omega$ is an embedded oriented submanifold of some bigger manifold, often $\R^k$, on which the form $\omega$ is defined.

== Topological preliminaries; integration over chains ==
Let M be a smooth manifold. A (smooth) singular k-simplex in M is defined as a smooth map from the standard simplex in R^{k} to M. The group C_{k}(M, Z) of singular k-chains on M is defined to be the free abelian group on the set of singular k-simplices in M. These groups, together with the boundary map, ∂, define a chain complex. The corresponding homology (resp. cohomology) group is isomorphic to the usual singular homology group H_{k}(M, Z) (resp. the singular cohomology group H^{k}(M, Z)), defined using continuous rather than smooth simplices in M.

On the other hand, the differential forms, with exterior derivative, d, as the connecting map, form a cochain complex, which defines the de Rham cohomology groups $H_{dR}^k(M, \mathbf{R})$.

Differential k-forms can be integrated over a k-simplex in a natural way, by pulling back to R^{k}. Extending by linearity allows one to integrate over chains. This gives a linear map from the space of k-forms to the kth group of singular cochains, C^{k}(M, Z), the linear functionals on C_{k}(M, Z). In other words, a k-form ω defines a functional
$$I(\omega)(c) = \oint_c \omega.$$
on the k-chains. Stokes' theorem says that this is a chain map from de Rham cohomology to singular cohomology with real coefficients; the exterior derivative, d, behaves like the dual of ∂ on forms. This gives a homomorphism from de Rham cohomology to singular cohomology. On the level of forms, this means:

1. closed forms, i.e., dω = 0, have zero integral over boundaries, i.e. over manifolds that can be written as ∂Σ_{c} M_{c}; and
2. exact forms, i.e., ω = dσ, have zero integral over cycles, i.e. if the boundaries sum up to the empty set: ∂Σ_{c} M_{c} = ∅.

De Rham's theorem shows that this homomorphism is in fact an isomorphism. So the converse to 1 and 2 above hold true. In other words, if {c_{i}} are cycles generating the kth homology group, then for any corresponding real numbers, {a_{i}} , there exist a closed form, ω, such that
$$\oint_{c_i} \omega = a_i\,,$$
and this form is unique up to exact forms.

Stokes' theorem on smooth manifolds can be derived from Stokes' theorem for chains in smooth manifolds, and vice versa. Formally stated, the latter reads:

Theorem (Stokes' theorem for chains)—If c is a smooth k-chain in a smooth manifold M, and ω is a smooth (k − 1)-form on M, then
$$\int_{\partial c}\omega = \int_c d\omega.$$

== Underlying principle ==

To simplify these topological arguments, it is worthwhile to examine the underlying principle by considering an example for d = 2 dimensions. The essential idea can be understood by the diagram on the left, which shows that, in an oriented tiling of a manifold, the interior paths are traversed in opposite directions; their contributions to the path integral thus cancel each other pairwise. As a consequence, only the contribution from the boundary remains. It thus suffices to prove Stokes' theorem for sufficiently fine tilings (or, equivalently, simplices), which usually is not difficult.

== Classical vector analysis example ==
Let $\gamma:[a,b]\to\R^2$ be a piecewise smooth Jordan plane curve. The Jordan curve theorem implies that $\gamma$ divides $\R^2$ into two components, a compact one and another that is non-compact. Let $D$ denote the compact part that is bounded by $\gamma$ and suppose $\psi:D\to\R^3$ is smooth, with $S=\psi(D)$. If $\Gamma$ is the space curve defined by $\Gamma(t)=\psi(\gamma(t))$ (Note: $\gamma$ and $\Gamma$ are both loops, however, $\Gamma$ is not necessarily a Jordan curve.) and $\textbf{F}$ is a smooth vector field on $\R^3$, then:
$$\oint_\Gamma \mathbf{F}\, \cdot\, d{\mathbf{\Gamma}}  = \iint_S \left( \nabla \times \mathbf{F} \right) \cdot\, d\mathbf{S}$$

This classical statement is a special case of the general formulation after making an identification of vector field with a 1-form and its curl with a two form through
$$\begin{pmatrix}
F_x \\
F_y \\
F_z \\
\end{pmatrix}\cdot d\Gamma \to F_x \,dx + F_y \,dy + F_z \,dz$$
$$\begin{align}
&\nabla \times \begin{pmatrix} F_x \\ F_y \\ F_z \end{pmatrix} \cdot d\mathbf{S} =
\begin{pmatrix}
\partial_y F_z - \partial_z F_y  \\
\partial_z F_x - \partial_x F_z \\
\partial_x F_y - \partial_y F_x  \\
\end{pmatrix} \cdot d\mathbf{S} \to \\[1.4ex]
&d(F_x \,dx + F_y \,dy + F_z \,dz) = \left(\partial_y F_z - \partial_z F_y\right) dy \wedge dz + \left(\partial_z F_x -\partial_x F_z\right) dz \wedge dx + \left(\partial_x F_y - \partial_y F_x\right) dx \wedge dy.
\end{align}$$

== Generalization to rough sets ==
A region (here called D instead of Ω) with piecewise smooth boundary. This is a manifold with corners, so its boundary is not a smooth manifold.

The formulation above, in which $\Omega$ is a smooth manifold with boundary, does not suffice in many applications. For example, if the domain of integration is defined as the plane region between two x-coordinates and the graphs of two functions, it will often happen that the domain has corners. In such a case, the corner points mean that $\Omega$ is not a smooth manifold with boundary, and so the statement of Stokes' theorem given above does not apply. Nevertheless, it is possible to check that the conclusion of Stokes' theorem is still true. This is because $\Omega$ and its boundary are well-behaved away from a small set of points (a measure zero set).

A version of Stokes' theorem that allows for roughness was proved by Hassler Whitney. Assume that $D$ is a connected bounded open subset of $\R^n$. Call $D$ a standard domain if it satisfies the following property: there exists a subset $P$ of $\partial D$, open in $\partial D$, whose complement in $\partial D$ has Hausdorff $(n-1)$-measure zero; and such that every point of $P$ has a generalized normal vector. This is a vector $\textbf{v}(x)$ such that, if a coordinate system is chosen so that $\textbf{v}(x)$ is the first basis vector, then, in an open neighborhood around $x$, there exists a smooth function $f(x_2,\dots,x_n)$ such that $P$ is the graph $\{x_1=f(x_2,\dots,x_n)\}$ and $D$ is the region $\{x_1:x_1<f(x_2,\dots,x_n)\}$. Whitney remarks that the boundary of a standard domain is the union of a set of zero Hausdorff $(n-1)$-measure and a finite or countable union of smooth $(n-1)$-manifolds, each of which has the domain on only one side. He then proves that if $D$ is a standard domain in $\R^n$, $\omega$ is an $(n-1)$-form which is defined, continuous, and bounded on $D\cup P$, smooth on $D$, integrable on $P$, and such that $d\omega$ is integrable on $D$, then Stokes' theorem holds, that is,
$$\int_P \omega = \int_D d\omega\,.$$

The study of measure-theoretic properties of rough sets leads to geometric measure theory. Even more general versions of Stokes' theorem have been proved by Federer and by Harrison.

== Special cases ==
The general form of the Stokes theorem using differential forms is more powerful and easier to use than the special cases. The traditional versions can be formulated using Cartesian coordinates without the machinery of differential geometry, and thus are more accessible. Further, they are older and their names are more familiar as a result. The traditional forms are often considered more convenient by practicing scientists and engineers but the non-naturalness of the traditional formulation becomes apparent when using other coordinate systems, even familiar ones like spherical or cylindrical coordinates. There is potential for confusion in the way names are applied, and the use of dual formulations.

=== Classical (vector calculus) case ===
An illustration of the vector-calculus Stokes theorem, with surface Σ, its boundary ∂Σ and the "normal" vector n.

This is a (dualized) $(1+1)$-dimensional case, for a 1-form (dualized because it is a statement about vector fields). This special case is often just referred to as Stokes' theorem in many introductory university vector calculus courses and is used in physics and engineering. It is also sometimes known as the curl theorem.

The classical Stokes' theorem relates the surface integral of the curl of a vector field over a surface $\Sigma$ in Euclidean three-space to the line integral of the vector field over its boundary. It is a special case of the general Stokes theorem (with $n=2$) once we identify a vector field with a 1-form using the metric on Euclidean 3-space. The curve of the line integral, $\partial\Sigma$, must have positive orientation, meaning that $\partial\Sigma$ points counterclockwise when the surface normal, $n$, points toward the viewer.

One consequence of this theorem is that the field lines of a vector field with zero curl cannot be closed contours. The formula can be rewritten as:

Theorem—Suppose $\textbf{F}=\big(P(x,y,z),Q(x,y,z),R(x,y,z)\big)$ is defined in a region with smooth surface $\Sigma$ and has continuous first-order partial derivatives. Then
$$\iint_\Sigma \Biggl(\left(\frac{\partial R}{\partial y} - \frac{\partial Q}{\partial z} \right) dy \, dz + \left(\frac{\partial P}{\partial z} - \frac{\partial R}{\partial x} \right) dz\,dx + \left (\frac{\partial Q}{\partial x} - \frac{\partial P}{\partial y}\right) dx \, dy\Biggr)
= \oint_{\partial\Sigma} \Big(P\,dx + Q\,dy + R\,dz\Big)\,,$$
where $P,Q$ and $R$ are the components of $\textbf{F}$, and $\partial\Sigma$ is the boundary of the region $\Sigma$.

=== Green's theorem ===
Green's theorem is immediately recognizable as the third integrand of both sides in the integral in terms of P, Q, and R cited above.

==== In electromagnetism ====
Two of the four Maxwell equations involve curls of 3-D vector fields, and their differential and integral forms are related by the special 3-dimensional (vector calculus) case of Stokes' theorem. Caution must be taken to avoid cases with moving boundaries: the partial time derivatives are intended to exclude such cases. If moving boundaries are included, interchange of integration and differentiation introduces terms related to boundary motion not included in the results below (see Differentiation under the integral sign):

Differential and integeral forms of Maxwell's electromagnetic equations involving curls of vector fields
Name	Differential form	Integral form (using three-dimensional Stokes theorem plus relativistic invariance, $\textstyle\int\tfrac{\partial}{\partial t}\dots\to\tfrac{d}{dt}\textstyle\int\cdots$)
Maxwell–Faraday equation Faraday's law of induction	$\nabla \times \mathbf{E} = -\frac{\partial \mathbf{B}} {\partial t}$	$$\begin{align} \oint_C \mathbf{E} \cdot d\mathbf{l} &= \iint_S  \nabla \times \mathbf{E} \cdot d\mathbf{A} \\ &= -\iint_S \frac{\partial \mathbf{B}}{\partial t} \cdot d\mathbf{A} \end{align}$$ (with C and S not necessarily stationary)
Ampère's law (with Maxwell's extension)	$\nabla \times \mathbf{H} = \mathbf{J} + \frac{\partial \mathbf{D}} {\partial t}$	$$\begin{align} \oint_C \mathbf{H} \cdot d\mathbf{l} &= \iint_S \nabla \times \mathbf{H} \cdot d\mathbf{A}\\ &= \iint_S \mathbf{J} \cdot d\mathbf{A} + \iint_S \frac{\partial \mathbf{D}}{\partial t} \cdot d\mathbf{A} \end{align}$$ (with C and S not necessarily stationary)

The above listed subset of Maxwell's equations are valid for electromagnetic fields expressed in SI units. In other systems of units, such as CGS or Gaussian units, the scaling factors for the terms differ. For example, in Gaussian units, Faraday's law of induction and Ampère's law take the forms:
$$\begin{align}
\nabla \times \mathbf{E} &= -\frac{1}{c} \frac{\partial \mathbf{B}} {\partial t}\,, \\
\nabla \times \mathbf{H} &= \frac{1}{c} \frac{\partial \mathbf{D}} {\partial t} + \frac{4\pi}{c} \mathbf{J}\,,
\end{align}$$
respectively, where c is the speed of light in vacuum.

=== Divergence theorem ===
Likewise, the divergence theorem
$$\int_\mathrm{Vol} \nabla \cdot \mathbf{F} \, d_\mathrm{Vol} = \oint_{\partial \operatorname{Vol}} \mathbf{F} \cdot d\boldsymbol{\Sigma}$$
is a special case if we identify a vector field with the $(n-1)$-form obtained by contracting the vector field with the Euclidean volume form. An application of this is the case $\textbf{F}=f\vec{c}$ where $\vec{c}$ is an arbitrary constant vector. Working out the divergence of the product gives
$$\vec{c} \cdot \int_\mathrm{Vol} \nabla f \, d_\mathrm{Vol} = \vec{c} \cdot \oint_{\partial \mathrm{Vol}} f\, d\boldsymbol{\Sigma}\,.$$
Since this holds for all $\vec{c}$ we find
$$\int_\mathrm{Vol} \nabla f \, d_\mathrm{Vol} = \oint_{\partial \mathrm{Vol}} f\, d\boldsymbol{\Sigma}\,.$$

=== Volume integral of gradient of scalar field ===
Let $f : \Omega \to \mathbb{R}$ be a scalar field. Then
$$\int_\Omega \vec{\nabla} f = \int_{\partial \Omega} \vec{n} f$$
where $\vec{n}$ is the normal vector to the surface $\partial \Omega$ at a given point.

Proof: Let $\vec{c}$ be a vector. Then
$$\begin{align}
0
&= \int_\Omega \vec{\nabla} \cdot \vec{c} f - \int_{\partial \Omega} \vec{n} \cdot \vec{c} f & \text{by the divergence theorem} \\
&= \int_\Omega \vec{c} \cdot \vec{\nabla} f - \int_{\partial \Omega} \vec{c} \cdot \vec{n} f \\
&= \vec{c} \cdot \int_\Omega \vec{\nabla} f - \vec{c} \cdot \int_{\partial \Omega} \vec{n} f \\
&= \vec{c} \cdot \left( \int_\Omega \vec{\nabla} f - \int_{\partial \Omega} \vec{n} f \right)
\end{align}$$
Since this holds for any $\vec{c}$ (in particular, for every basis vector), the result follows.

== See also ==
- Chandrasekhar–Wentzel lemma
