= Jerome Kristian =

American cosmologist

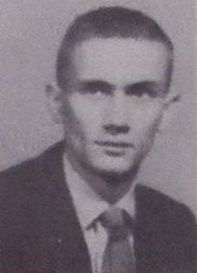
Jerome Kristian in 1952.

Jerome "Jerry" Kristian (born June 5, 1933 in Milwaukee, d. June 22, 1996 in Ventura County, California) was a theoretical and observational cosmologist, and the first to provide observational evidence of quasar host galaxies.

Kristian began his career in theoretical cosmology but transitioned into observation while working at the Mount Wilson Observatory in the 1960s and 1970s. He helped to pioneer the observational study of pulsars and quasars and participated in the development of the Hubble Space Telescope. He was the first to provide observational support for the now widely accepted theory that quasars are supermassive black holes at the center of distant galaxies.

== Education ==
At the undergraduate level, Kristian attended Shimer College, a small Great Books college then located in Mount Carroll, Illinois. Because of the school's early entrance program, which began in 1950, he was able to enter college before completing high school. He served as editor-in-chief of the school yearbook and graduated with an AB degree in 1953, while he was still 19. After graduating, he attended the University of Texas for specialized study in physics.

On August 27, 1955, Kristian married Mary Jeanes, a fellow Shimer student who had also moved to the University of Texas, in her case to pursue advanced study in Spanish.

For his graduate studies, starting in the fall of 1955, Kristian attended the University of Chicago, receiving his MS in 1956 and his Ph.D. in 1962. His Ph.D. dissertation, entitled "Hydromagnetic Equilibrium of a Fluid Sphere" and supervised by Subrahmanyan Chandrasekhar, was split into three separate papers and published in The Astrophysical Journal in 1963 and 1964.

== Career ==
After graduation, Kristian returned to the University of Texas as an instructor, working there from 1962 to 1964. In 1963, Kristian and his former teacher Rainer K. Sachs coauthored a paper on Observations in Cosmology. In a special editorial note accompanying a reprint of the paper in 2010, George Ellis called it "one of the least appreciated fundamental papers in theoretical cosmology." The paper "carries out the project of showing how to determine the spacetime structure directly from astronomical observations in the generic General Relativity case, i.e without assuming any preconceived geometry for the universe, using a power series in distance from the origin of observation." 1963 also saw the publication of a key work by Boris Trakhtenbrot, Algorithms and Automatic Computing Machines, which Kristian had cotranslated with James McCawley and Samuel Schmitt.

After leaving the University of Texas, Kristian taught briefly at the University of Wisconsin, but soon moved on to California where he worked at the Mount Wilson Observatory, first as a fellow from 1966 to 1968, and thereafter as a full member of the observatory. The move heralded a shift in his interests from theory to observation, and Kristian published approximately 40 papers in observational astronomy during the 1960s and 1970s. His work, chiefly done in collaboration with Allan Sandage and James Westphal, focused on the optical identification of radio-wave sources such as pulsars and quasars. Westphal recalled the partnership "I was the guy who ran the equipment. Allan was the guy who decided what was good to do. And Jerry was the guy who was supposed to be analyzing the data."

During this period, Westphal and Kristian conducted groundbreaking work on the use of silicon target (S-T) and silicon intensified target (SIT) detectors in cameras, as well as CCD detectors. This work led to a number of key discoveries, and also laid the groundwork for the Hubble Space Telescope; Westphal and Kristian began working in the Planetary Camera Team of the Hubble program in 1974. Kristian worked on the Hubble program while also continuing a steady program of ground-based observations, leading to publications on supermassive galactic nuclei and gravitational lensing. He continued to work actively in these fields until his death.

In 1973, Kristian photographed 26 low-redshift quasars and confirmed for the first time the presence of optical "fuzz" around them, indicating galaxies which were too faint to be identified directly. Kristian's observations provided the first observational support for the theory, first advanced by quasar co-discoverer Maarten Schmidt, that quasars were located at the center of extremely distant galaxies. His work on quasar host galaxies laid the groundwork for what later became a very active field of study.

In discussing Cygnus X1 with the press in the early 1970s, Kristian had described himself as an "ultra-conservative" on the question of black holes. However, with the publications of his team's findings together with those of another team at Caltech in 1978, Kristian publicly affirmed that black holes were the most plausible explanation: "If there wasn't much mass there, then we would be seeing some evidence of the structure coming apart. But there is no evidence of that. So something has to be there, holding it all together."

== Death and legacy ==
On June 22, 1996, Kristian drowned when his ultralight aircraft crashed into the Santa Clara River after clipping a nearby power line. Nearby farmworkers raced to the scene, but Kristian died before they could extract him.

Kristian's death left many projects unfinished, and as a result, he continued to be listed as an author on scientific papers through the year 2000.

Kristian's 1966 paper coauthored with Rainer K. Sachs on Observations in Cosmology was republished in 2010 by General Relativity and Gravitation.

Kristian's explanation of a CCD in terms of regularly-spaced buckets being used to measure rainfall remains widely cited.

== Writings ==
=== Books ===
- Allan Sandage; Mary Sandage & Jerome Kristian (1975). Galaxies and the Universe. University of Chicago Press.

== Works cited ==
- Ellis, George (2011). "Editorial note to: Jerome Kristian and Rainer K. Sachs, Observations in cosmology". General Relativity and Gravitation. 43 (1): 331–336. Bibcode:2011GReGr..43..331E. doi:10.1007/s10714-010-1112-3.
- Ho, Luis C. (2004). "Introduction". Coevolution of Black Holes and Galaxies. Vol. 1. Cambridge University Press. p. xv. ISBN 978-0521824491.
- Munch, Guido (1996). "Obituary: Jerome Kristian, 1934-1996". Bulletin of the American Astronomical Society. 29 (4): 1476–1477. Bibcode:1997BAAS...29.1476M.
- Westphal, James (July 1998). "Interview With James A. Westphal". Caltech Oral Histories.
