= Paul H. Roberts =

English physicist (1929–2022)

- Born: Paul Harry Roberts; 13 September 1929; Aberystwyth, Ceredigion, Wales
- Died: 17 November 2022 (aged 93); Isle of Wight, England
- Education: University of Cambridge
- Known for: Roberts–Stewartson instability
- Scientific career
- Fields: Astrophysics; Physics
- Workplaces: Yerkes Observatory; AWRE; Newcastle University; University of Chicago; University of California, Los Angeles
- Thesis: Some applications of electromagnetic theory to the problem of the main geomagnetic field (1954)
- Doctoral advisor: Hermann Bondi (dropped); Keith Runcorn

Paul Harry Roberts FRS (13 September 1929 – 17 November 2022) was a British physicist who specialised in theoretical physics, particularly in the area of astrophysics and magnetohydrodynamics.

== Background ==
Paul Roberts was born in Aberystwyth in Wales. Paul started his PhD with Hermann Bondi, but then in the third year his advisor was changed to Keith Runcorn. He completed his PhD in 1954. He worked with Subrahmanyan Chandrasekhar at the Yerkes Observatory for the following year, before returning to UK to finish his national service at the AWRE. From 1956 to 1961, he was appointed at the faculty of Newcastle University. In 1961, Subrahmanyan Chandrasekhar invited Paul to join the faculty at the University of Chicago which he did until 1963 before returning to the Newcastle University in 1963. He remained in the later place until his retirement in 1986. Not happy with the forced retirement in the UK, he accepted the joint-appointment offer from the University of California, Los Angeles Department of Mathematics and Institute of Geophysics and Planetary Physics and hold the positions until his death in November 2022.

== Research ==
In his research career, Paul has made seminal contributions in the field of astrophysics, magnetohydrodynamics, fluid dynamics, superfluidity and dynamo theory.

== Awards and honours ==
Roberts was elected as a Fellow of the Royal Astronomical Society in 1955 and the Royal Society in 1979. He was elected as a fellow of the American Geophysical Union in 1987 and American Academy of Arts and Sciences in 2001. He is the recipient of John Adam Fleming medal in 1999.
