= Chandrasekhar number =

Dimensionless number in fluid mechanics

The Chandrasekhar number is a dimensionless quantity used in magnetic convection to represent the ratio of the Lorentz force to the viscosity. It is named after the Indian astrophysicist Subrahmanyan Chandrasekhar.

The number's main function is to measure the magnetic field; it is proportional to the square of a system's characteristic magnetic field.

== Definition ==
The Chandrasekhar number is usually denoted by the letter $\ Q$ and is motivated by a dimensionless form of the Navier-Stokes equation in the presence of a magnetic force in the equations of magnetohydrodynamics:

$$\frac{1}{\sigma}\left(\frac{\partial^{}\mathbf{u}}{\partial t^{}}\ +\ (\mathbf{u} \cdot \nabla) \mathbf{u}\right)\ =\ - {\mathbf \nabla }p\ +\ \nabla^2 \mathbf{u}\ +\frac {\sigma}{\zeta} {Q}\ ({\mathbf \nabla} \wedge \mathbf{B}) \wedge\mathbf{B},$$

where $\ \sigma$ is the Prandtl number, and $\ \zeta$ is the magnetic Prandtl number.

The Chandrasekhar number is thus defined as:

$${Q}\ =\ \frac{{B_0}^2 d^2}{\mu_0 \rho \nu \lambda}$$

where $\ \mu_0$ is the magnetic permeability, $\ \rho$ is the density of the fluid, $\ \nu$ is the kinematic viscosity, and $\ \lambda$ is the magnetic diffusivity. $\ B_0$ and $\ d$ are a characteristic magnetic field and a length scale of the system, respectively.

It is related to the Hartmann number, $\ Ha$, by the relation:

$$Q\ {=}\ Ha^2\$$

== See also ==
- Rayleigh number
- Taylor number
