= Chandrasekhar–Wentzel lemma =

In vector calculus, Chandrasekhar–Wentzel lemma was derived by Subrahmanyan Chandrasekhar and Gregor Wentzel in 1965, while studying the stability of rotating liquid drop. The lemma states that if $\mathbf S$ is a surface bounded by a simple closed contour $C$, then
$$\mathbf L = \oint_C \mathbf x\times(d\mathbf x\times\mathbf n) = -\int_{\mathbf S}(\mathbf x\times\mathbf n)\nabla\cdot\mathbf n\ dS.$$
Here $\mathbf x$ is the position vector and $\mathbf n$ is the unit normal on the surface. An immediate consequence is that if $\mathbf S$ is a closed surface, then the line integral tends to zero, leading to the result,
$$\int_{\mathbf S}(\mathbf x\times\mathbf n)\nabla\cdot\mathbf n\ dS =0,$$
or, in index notation, we have
$$\int_{\mathbf S}x_j\nabla\cdot\mathbf n\ dS_k = \int_{\mathbf S} x_k \nabla \cdot \mathbf n\ dS_j.$$

That is to say the tensor
$$T_{ij} = \int_{\mathbf S}x_j\nabla\cdot\mathbf n\ dS_i$$
defined on a closed surface is always symmetric, i.e., $T_{ij}=T_{ji}$.

== Proof ==
Let us write the vector in index notation, but summation convention will be avoided throughout the proof. Then the left hand side can be written as
$$L_i = \oint_C [dx_i(n_jx_j+n_kx_k) + dx_j(-n_ix_j)+dx_k(-n_ix_k)].$$

Converting the line integral to surface integral using Stokes's theorem, we get
$$L_i = \int_{\mathbf S} \left\{n_i\left[\frac{\partial }{\partial x_j}(-n_ix_k) - \frac{\partial }{\partial x_k}(-n_ix_j)\right] + n_j \left[\frac{\partial }{\partial x_k}(n_jx_j+n_kx_k) - \frac{\partial }{\partial x_i}(-n_ix_k)\right] + n_k\left[\frac{\partial }{\partial x_i}(-n_ix_j) - \frac{\partial }{\partial x_j}(n_jx_j+n_kx_k)\right]\right\}\ dS.$$

Carrying out the requisite differentiation and after some rearrangement, we get
$$L_i = \int_{\mathbf S} \left[-\frac{1}{2}x_k\frac{\partial }{\partial x_j}(n_i^2+n_k^2) + \frac{1}{2} x_j\frac{\partial }{\partial x_k}(n_i^2+n_j^2)+n_jx_k\left(\frac{\partial n_i}{\partial x_i} + \frac{\partial n_k}{\partial x_k}\right) - n_kx_j \left(\frac{\partial n_i}{\partial x_i} + \frac{\partial n_j}{\partial x_j}\right)\right]\ dS,$$
or, in other words,
$$L_i = \int_{\mathbf S} \left[\frac{1}{2} \left(x_j\frac{\partial }{\partial x_k}-x_k\frac{\partial }{\partial x_j}\right) |\mathbf n|^2 - (x_jn_k-x_kn_j)\nabla\cdot\mathbf n\right]\ dS.$$

And since $|\mathbf n|^2=1$, we have
$$L_i = - \int_{\mathbf S}(x_jn_k-x_kn_j)\nabla\cdot\mathbf n\ dS,$$
thus proving the lemma.
