= Chandrasekhar's variational principle =

Equation of stability for a star

In astrophysics, Chandrasekhar's variational principle provides the stability criterion for a static barotropic star, subjected to radial perturbation, named after the Indian American astrophysicist Subrahmanyan Chandrasekhar.

== Statement ==
A baratropic star with $\frac{d\rho}{dr}<0$ and $\rho(R)=0$ is stable if the quantity

$$\mathcal{E}(\rho') = \int_V \left| \frac{d\Phi}{d\rho}\right|_0 \rho'^2 d \mathbf{x} - G \int_V\int_V \frac{\rho'(\mathbf{x})\rho'(\mathbf{x'})}{|\mathbf{x}-\mathbf{x'}|} d\mathbf{x}d\mathbf{x'} \quad \text{where} \quad \Phi = -G\int_V \frac{\rho(\mathbf{x'})}{|\mathbf{x}-\mathbf{x'}|}d\mathbf{x},$$

is non-negative for all real functions $\rho'(\mathbf{x})$ that conserve the total mass of the star $\int_V \rho' d\mathbf{x} = 0$.

where

- $\mathbf{x}$ is the coordinate system fixed to the center of the star
- $R$ is the radius of the star
- $V$ is the volume of the star
- $\rho(\mathbf{x})$ is the unperturbed density
- $\rho'(\mathbf{x})$ is the small perturbed density such that in the perturbed state, the total density is $\rho+\rho'$
- $\Phi$ is the self-gravitating potential from Newton's law of gravity
- $G$ is the Gravitational constant
