= Hartmann number =

Dimensionless parameter in fluid mechanics

The Hartmann number (Ha) is the ratio of electromagnetic force to the viscous force, first introduced by Julius Hartmann (1881 – 1951) of Denmark. It is frequently encountered in fluid flows through magnetic fields. It is defined by:

$$\mathrm{Ha} = B L\sqrt{\frac{\sigma} {\mu}}$$

where

- B is the magnetic field intensity
- L is the characteristic length scale
- σ is the electrical conductivity
- μ is the dynamic viscosity

== See also ==
- Magnetohydrodynamics
