= Astrobiophysics =

Study of astrophysical influence upon known forms of life

Astrobiophysics is a field of intersection between astrophysics and biophysics concerned with the influence of the astrophysical phenomena upon life on planet Earth or some other planet in general. It differs from astrobiology which is concerned with the search of extraterrestrial life. Examples of the topics covered by this branch of science include the effect of supernovae on life on Earth and the effects of cosmic rays on irradiation at sea level.
