= Polarization in astronomy =

Polarization of electromagnetic radiation is a useful tool for detecting various astronomical phenomena. For example, energy can become polarized by passing through interstellar dust or by magnetic fields. Microwave energy from the primordial universe can be used to study the physics of that environment.

== Stars ==
The polarization of starlight was first observed by the astronomers William Hiltner and John S. Hall in 1949. Subsequently, Jesse Greenstein and Leverett Davis, Jr. developed theories allowing the use of polarization data to trace interstellar magnetic fields. Though the integrated thermal radiation of stars is not usually appreciably polarized at source, scattering by interstellar dust can impose polarization on starlight over long distances. Net polarization at the source can occur if the photosphere itself is asymmetric, due to limb polarization. Plane polarization of starlight generated at the star itself is observed for Ap stars (peculiar A type stars).

== Sun ==
Both circular and linear polarization of sunlight has been measured. Circular polarization is mainly due to transmission and absorption effects in strongly magnetic regions of the Sun's surface. Another mechanism that gives rise to circular polarization is the so-called "alignment-to-orientation mechanism". Continuum light is linearly polarized at different locations across the face of the Sun (limb polarization) though taken as a whole, this polarization cancels. Linear polarization in spectral lines is usually created by anisotropic scattering of photons on atoms and ions which can themselves be polarized by this interaction. The linearly polarized spectrum of the Sun is often called the second solar spectrum. Atomic polarization can be modified in weak magnetic fields by the Hanle effect. As a result, polarization of the scattered photons is also modified providing a diagnostics tool for understanding stellar magnetic fields.

== Other sources ==
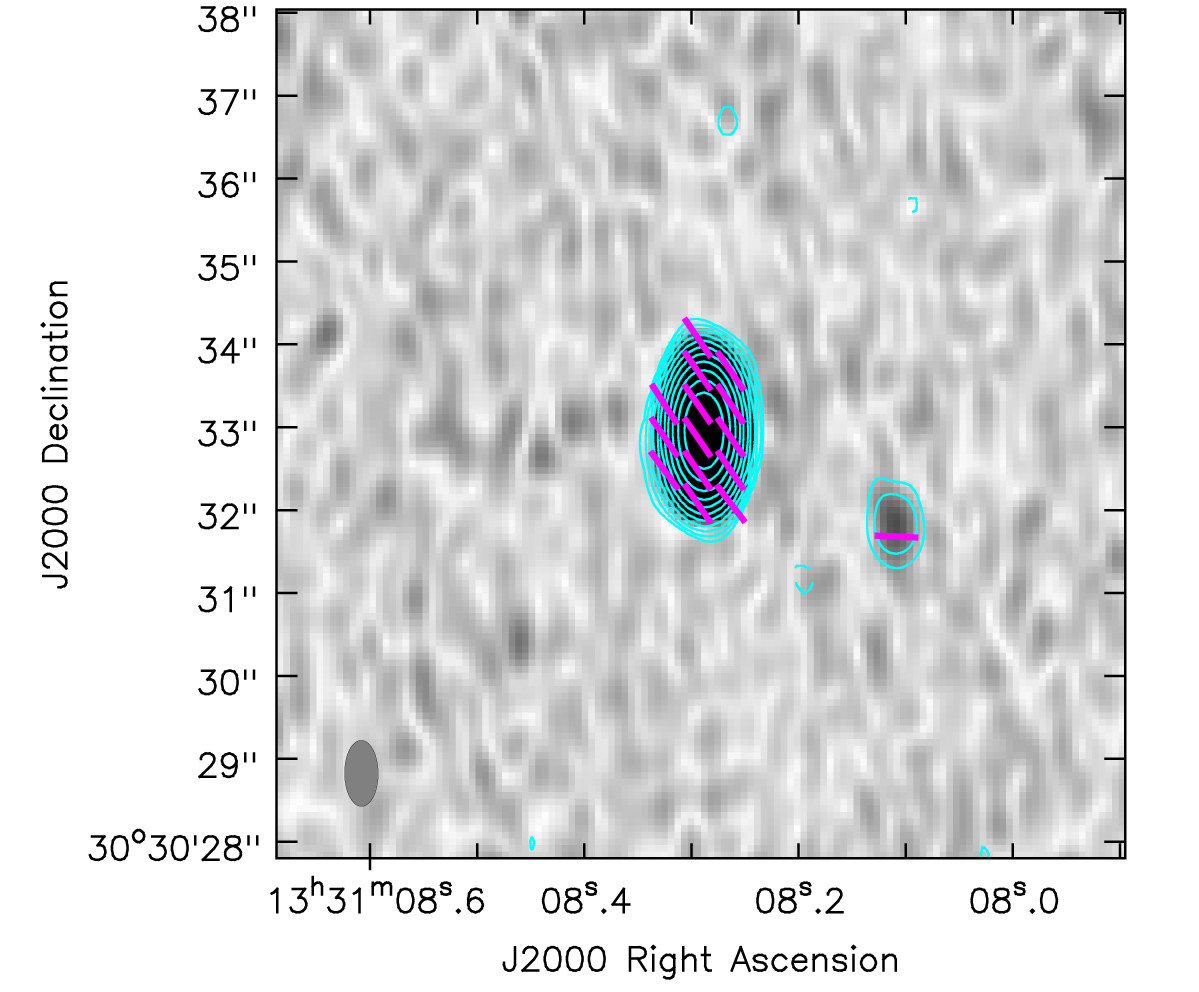
The polarization in the quasar 3C 286 measured with ALMA

Polarization is also present in radiation from coherent astronomical sources due to the Zeeman effect (e.g. hydroxyl or methanol masers).

The large radio lobes in active galaxies and pulsar radio radiation (which may, it is speculated, sometimes be coherent) also show polarization.

Apart from providing information on sources of radiation and scattering, polarization also probes the interstellar magnetic field in our galaxy as well as in radio galaxies via Faraday rotation. In some cases it can be difficult to determine how much of the Faraday rotation is in the external source and how much is local to our own galaxy, but in many cases it is possible to find another distant source nearby in the sky; thus by comparing the candidate source and the reference source, the results can be untangled.

Additionally, polarization is present in cataclysmic variables. X-Rays from polar cataclysmic variables are polarized both from scattering off the accretion column and reflecting off the surface of the white dwarf. In intermediate polars, the only significant source of polarization is from the surface of the white dwarf, in which the polarization degree directly measures the total reflection amplitude emergent in both Thomson and Compton scattering.

== Cosmic microwave background ==
The polarization of the cosmic microwave background (CMB) is also being used to study the physics of the very early universe. CMB exhibits 2 components of polarization: B-mode (divergence-free like magnetic field) and E-mode (curl-free gradient-only like electric field) polarization. The BICEP2 telescope located at the South Pole initially claimed the detection of B-mode polarization in the CMB, though the initially claimed result was later retracted. The polarization modes of the CMB may provide more information about the influence of gravitational waves on the development of the early universe.

It has been suggested that astronomical sources of polarized light caused the chirality found in biological molecules on Earth.

An artist's impression of how a filter allows only polarised light through

An animation showing how a planet's atmosphere polarises light from its parent star. Comparing the starlight with the light reflected from the planet gives information about the planet's atmosphere.

== See also ==
- Chandrasekhar polarization
