= SDSS J120136.02+300305.5 =

Galaxy in the constellation Ursa Major

SDSS J120136.02+300305.5 is an optically inactive, quiescent galaxy that possibly contains a milliparsec supermassive black hole binary.

== Discovery ==
X-ray fluxes in the galaxy were first detected in June 2010 with a flux 56 times higher than an upper limit from ROSAT, corresponding to L_{X} ~ 3 × 10^{44} erg s^{−1}. It had the rough optical spectrum of quiescent galaxy. All in all, the flux evolved in fair consistency with the normal t^{−5/3} model, something that would be normal for returning stellar debris, before fading by a factor of roughly 300 after 300 days. However, the source was incredibly volatile, becoming invisible between 27 and 48 days after discovery. It may have matched a Bremsstrahlung or double-power-law model and usually softens as time passes.
