= 1958 Chandra =

Dark main-belt asteroid

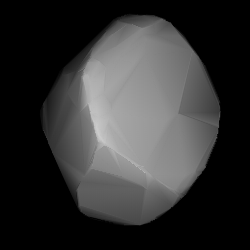
- Modelled shape of Chandra from its lightcurve

Discovery
- Discovered by: C. U. Cesco
- Discovery site: El Leoncito (Yale–Columbia Station)
- Discovery date: 24 September 1970

Designations
- Named after: Subrahmanyan Chandrasekhar (astrophysicist)
- Alternative designations: 1970 SB · 1947 HD; 1959 RG_{1} · 1965 UN; 1971 XA
- Minor planet category: main-belt · (outer)

Orbital characteristics
- Epoch 4 September 2017 (JD 2458000.5)
- Uncertainty parameter 0
- Observation arc: 62.66 yr (22,887 days)
- Aphelion: 3.6220 AU
- Perihelion: 2.5840 AU
- Semi-major axis: 3.1030 AU
- Eccentricity: 0.1673
- Orbital period (sidereal): 5.47 yr (1,997 days)
- Mean anomaly: 233.69°
- Mean motion: 0° 10^{m} 49.08^{s} / day
- Inclination: 10.559°
- Longitude of ascending node: 345.04°
- Argument of perihelion: 318.95°

Physical characteristics
- Dimensions: 33.82 km (derived); 34.278±0.220; 36.167±0.349 km
- Synodic rotation period: 7.0571±0.0029 h 7.070±0.004 h
- Geometric albedo: 0.0511 (derived); 0.0709±0.0138; 0.082±0.007
- Spectral type: C
- Absolute magnitude (H): 10.7 · 11.102±0.003 (R) · 11.18±0.18 · 11.2

1958 Chandra (prov. designation: 1970 SB) is a dark background asteroid from the outer region of the asteroid belt, approximately 35 kilometers (22 miles) in diameter. It was discovered on 24 September 1970, by Argentinian astronomer Carlos Cesco at the Yale–Columbia Southern Station of the Leoncito Astronomical Complex in San Juan, Argentina (also see Félix Aguilar Observatory). It was named after astrophysicist Subrahmanyan Chandrasekhar.

== Orbit and classification ==
Chandra is a dark C-type asteroid that orbits the Sun in the outer main-belt at a distance of 2.6–3.6 AU once every 5 years and 6 months (1,997 days). Its orbit has an eccentricity of 0.17 and an inclination of 11° with respect to the ecliptic. In April 1947, the asteroid was first identified as 1947 HD at Algiers Observatory. The body's observation arc begins 16 years prior to its official discovery observation with a precovery taken at Palomar Observatory in 1954.

== Naming ==
This minor planet was named in honor of Subrahmanyan Chandrasekhar (1910–1995), the Nobel Prize winning Indian–American theoretical astrophysicist (also see Chandrasekhar limit). The approved naming citation was published by the Minor Planet Center on 1 November 1979 (M.P.C. 5013).

== Physical characteristics ==
=== Photometry ===
In December 2010, a rotational lightcurve was obtained for this asteroid from photometric observations at the U.S. Palomar Transient Factory, California. It gave a rotation period of 7.0571±0.0029 hours with a brightness variation of 0.35 magnitude (U=2). A second lightcurve, obtained by Italian amateur astronomer Silvano Casulli in August 2014, gave a concurring period of 7.070±0.004 hours with an amplitude of 0.38 in magnitude (U=3-).

=== Diameter and albedo ===
According to the survey carried out by the NEOWISE mission of NASA's Wide-field Infrared Survey Explorer, the asteroid measures 36.2 kilometers in diameter and its surface has an albedo of 0.07, while the Collaborative Asteroid Lightcurve Link derives an albedo of 0.05 and a diameter of 33.8 kilometers with an absolute magnitude of 11.2.
