= Farley–Buneman instability =

Microscopic plasma instability

The Farley–Buneman instability, or FB instability, is a microscopic plasma instability named after Donald T. Farley and Oscar Buneman. It is similar to the ionospheric Rayleigh-Taylor instability.

It occurs in collisional plasma with neutral component, and is driven by drift currents. It can be thought of as a modified two-stream instability arising from the difference in drifts of electrons and ions exceeding the ion acoustic speed. It occurs in collisional plasma with neutrals driven by drift current for two stream instability for unmagnetized plasma it becomes "Buneman instability".

It is present in the equatorial and polar ionospheric E-regions. In particular, it occurs in the equatorial electrojet due to the drift of electrons relative to ions, and also in the trails behind ablating meteoroids.

Since the FB fluctuations can scatter electromagnetic waves, the instability can be used to diagnose the state of ionosphere by the use of electromagnetic pulses.

== Conditions ==
To derive the dispersion relation below, we make the following assumptions. First, quasi-neutrality is assumed. This is appropriate if we restrict ourselves to wavelengths longer than the Debye length. Second, the collision frequency between ions and background neutral particles is assumed to be much greater than the ion cyclotron frequency, allowing the ions to be treated as unmagnetized. Third, the collision frequency between electrons and background neutrals is assumed to be much less than the electron cyclotron frequency. Finally, we only analyze low frequency waves so that we can neglect electron inertia. Because the Buneman instability is electrostatic in nature, only electrostatic perturbations are considered.

== Dispersion relation ==
We use linearized fluid equations (equation of motion, equation of continuity) for electrons and ions with Lorentz force and collisional terms. The equation of motion for each species is:

Electrons: $0 = -e n \left(\mathbf{E} + \mathbf{v}_e \times \mathbf{B}\right) - k_\text{B} T_e \nabla n - m_e n \nu_{en} \mathbf{v}_e$
Ions: $m_i n \frac{dv_i}{dt} = e n \left(\mathbf{E} + \mathbf{v}_i \times \mathbf{B}\right) - k_\text{B} T_i \nabla n - m_i n \nu_{in} \mathbf{v}_i$

where

- $m_s$ is the mass of species $s$
- $v_s$ is the velocity of species $s$
- $T_s$ is the temperature of species $s$
- $\nu_{sn}$ is the frequency of collisions between species s and neutral particles
- $e$ is the charge of an electron
- $n$ is the electron number density
- $k_\text{B}$ is the Boltzmann constant

Note that electron inertia has been neglected, and that both species are assumed to have the same number density at every point in space ($n_i = n_e = n$).The collisional term describes the momentum loss frequency of each fluid due to collisions of charged particles with neutral particles in the plasma. We denote $\nu_{en}$ as the frequency of collisions between electrons and neutrals, and $\nu_{in}$ as the frequency of collisions between ions and neutrals. We also assume that all perturbed properties, such as species velocity, density, and the electric field, behave as plane waves. In other words, all physical quantities $f$ will behave as an exponential function of time $t$ and position $x$ (where $k$ is the wave number): $f \sim \exp{\left[-i\left(\omega t - k x\right)\right]}.$ This can lead to oscillations if the frequency $\omega$ is a real number, or to either exponential growth or exponential decay if $\omega$ is complex. If we assume that the ambient electric and magnetic fields are perpendicular to one another and only analyze waves propagating perpendicular to both of these fields, the dispersion relation takes the form of: $\omega\left( 1 + i \psi_0 \frac{\omega - i \nu_{in}}{\nu_{in}}\right) = k v_E + i \psi_0 \frac{k^2 c_i^2}{\nu_{in}} ,$ where $v_E$ is the $E\times B$ drift and $c_i$ is the acoustic speed of ions. The coefficient $\psi_0$ described the combined effect of electron and ion collisions as well as their cyclotron frequencies $\Omega_i$ and $\Omega_e$: $\psi_0=\frac{\nu_{in}\nu_{en}}{\Omega_i \Omega_e}.$

== Growth rate ==
Solving the dispersion we arrive at frequency given as: $\omega = \omega_r + i \gamma,$ where $\gamma$ describes the growth rate of the instability. For FB we have the following: $\omega_r = \frac{k v_E}{1+ \psi_0}$ $\gamma =\frac{\psi_0}{\nu_{in}} \frac{\omega_r^2-k^2 c_i^2 }{1+ \psi_0}.$

== Buneman instability ==
The dispersion relation is $1 - \frac{\omega_p^2}{\omega^2} - \frac{\omega_p^2}{\left(\omega - k v_0\right) ^2} = 0$ and the growth rate is $\gamma = \sqrt{3} \omega_p {\left(Z_i \frac{m_e}{m_i}\right)}^{1/3}$

== See also ==
- Plasma stability
- Plasma Instabilities
