= Chandrasekhar virial equations =

In astrophysics, the Chandrasekhar virial equations are a hierarchy of moment equations of the Euler equations, developed by the Indian American astrophysicist Subrahmanyan Chandrasekhar, and the physicist Enrico Fermi and Norman R. Lebovitz.

== Mathematical description ==
Consider a fluid mass $M$ of volume $V$ with density $\rho(\mathbf{x},t)$ and an isotropic pressure $p(\mathbf{x},t)$ with vanishing pressure at the bounding surfaces. Here, $\mathbf{x}$ refers to a frame of reference attached to the center of mass. Before describing the virial equations, let's define some moments.

The density moments are defined as

$$M = \int_V \rho \, d\mathbf{x}, \quad I_i = \int_V \rho x_i \, d\mathbf{x}, \quad I_{ij} = \int_V \rho x_i x_j \, d\mathbf{x}, \quad I_{ijk} = \int_V \rho x_i x_j x_k \, d\mathbf{x}, \quad I_{ijk\ell} = \int_V \rho x_i x_j x_k x_\ell \, d\mathbf{x}, \quad \text{etc.}$$

the pressure moments are

$$\Pi = \int_V p \, d\mathbf{x}, \quad \Pi_i = \int_V p x_i \, d\mathbf{x}, \quad \Pi_{ij} = \int_V p x_i x_j \, d\mathbf{x}, \quad \Pi_{ijk} = \int_V p x_i x_j x_kd\mathbf{x} \quad \text{etc.}$$

the kinetic energy moments are

$$T_{ij} = \frac 1 2 \int_V \rho u_i u_j \, d\mathbf{x}, \quad T_{ij;k} = \frac 1 2 \int_V \rho u_i u_j x_k \, d\mathbf{x}, \quad T_{ij;k\ell} = \frac 1 2 \int_V \rho u_i u_j x_kx_\ell \, d\mathbf{x}, \quad \mathrm{etc.}$$

and the Chandrasekhar potential energy tensor moments are

$$W_{ij} = - \frac{1}{2} \int_V \rho \Phi_{ij} \, d\mathbf{x}, \quad  W_{ij;k} = - \frac 1 2 \int_V \rho \Phi_{ij} x_k \, d\mathbf{x}, \quad  W_{ij;k\ell} = - \frac 1 2 \int_V \rho \Phi_{ij} x_k x_\ell d\mathbf{x}, \quad \mathrm{etc.} \quad \text{where} \quad \Phi_{ij} = G\int_V \rho(\mathbf{x'}) \frac{(x_i-x_i')(x_j-x_j')}{|\mathbf{x}-\mathbf{x'}|^3} \, d\mathbf{x'}$$

where $G$ is the gravitational constant.

All the tensors are symmetric by definition. The moment of inertia $I$, kinetic energy $T$ and the potential energy $W$ are just traces of the following tensors

$$I = I_{ii} = \int_V \rho |\mathbf{x}|^2 \, d\mathbf{x}, \quad T = T_{ii} = \frac{1}{2} \int_V \rho |\mathbf{u}|^2 \, d\mathbf{x}, \quad W = W_{ii} = - \frac{1}{2}\int_V \rho \Phi \, d\mathbf{x} \quad \text{where} \quad \Phi = \Phi_{ii} = \int_V \frac{\rho(\mathbf{x'})}{|\mathbf{x}-\mathbf{x'}|} \, d\mathbf{x'}$$

Chandrasekhar assumed that the fluid mass is subjected to pressure force and its own gravitational force, then the Euler equation is

$$\rho \frac{du_i}{dt} = - \frac{\partial p}{\partial x_i} + \rho \frac{\partial \Phi}{\partial x_i}, \quad \text{where} \quad \frac{d}{dt} = \frac{\partial}{\partial t} + u_j \frac{\partial}{\partial x_j}$$

=== First order virial equation ===
$$\frac{d^2I_i}{dt^2} =0$$

=== Second order virial equation ===
$$\frac{1}{2}\frac{d^2I_{ij}}{dt^2} = 2T_{ij} + W_{ij} + \delta_{ij} \Pi$$

In steady state, the equation becomes

$$2T_{ij} + W_{ij} = -\delta_{ij} \Pi$$

=== Third order virial equation ===
$$\frac{1}{6} \frac{d^2 I_{ijk}}{dt^2} = 2 (T_{ij;k} + T_{jk;i} + T_{ki;j}) + W_{ij;k} + W_{jk;i} + W_{ki;j} + \delta_{ij} \Pi_k + \delta_{jk}\Pi_i + \delta_{ki}\Pi_j$$

In steady state, the equation becomes

$$2(T_{ij;k} + T_{ik;j}) + W_{ij;k} + W_{ik;j} = - \delta_{ij}\Pi_K -\delta_{ik}\Pi_j$$

== Virial equations in rotating frame of reference ==
The Euler equations in a rotating frame of reference, rotating with an angular velocity $\mathbf{\Omega}$ is given by

$$\rho \frac{du_i}{dt} = - \frac{\partial p}{\partial x_i} + \rho \frac{\partial \Phi}{\partial x_i} + \frac{1}{2} \rho \frac{\partial}{\partial x_i} |\mathbf{\Omega}\times\mathbf{x}|^2 + 2 \rho \varepsilon_{i\ell m} u_\ell \Omega_m$$

where $\varepsilon_{i\ell m}$ is the Levi-Civita symbol, $\frac{1}{2} |\mathbf{\Omega}\times\mathbf{x}|^2$ is the centrifugal acceleration and $2\mathbf u \times \mathbf\Omega$ is the Coriolis acceleration.

=== Steady state second order virial equation ===
In steady state, the second order virial equation becomes

$$2T_{ij} + W_{ij} + \Omega^2 I_{ij} - \Omega_i\Omega_kI_{kj}  + 2 \epsilon_{i\ell m} \Omega_m \int_V \rho u_\ell x_j \, d\mathbf x = - \delta_{ij} \Pi$$

If the axis of rotation is chosen in $x_3$ direction, the equation becomes

$$W_{ij} + \Omega^2 (I_{ij} - \delta_{i3} I_{3j}) = -\delta_{ij} \Pi$$

and Chandrasekhar shows that in this case, the tensors can take only the following form

$$W_{ij} = \begin{pmatrix}
W_{11} & W_{12} & 0  \\
W_{21} & W_{22} & 0  \\
0   & 0 & W_{33}
\end{pmatrix}, \quad I_{ij} = \begin{pmatrix}
I_{11} & I_{12} & 0  \\
I_{21} & I_{22} & 0  \\
0   & 0 & I_{33}
\end{pmatrix}$$

=== Steady state third order virial equation ===
In steady state, the third order virial equation becomes

$$2(T_{ij;k} + T_{ik;j}) + W_{ij;k} + W_{ik;j} + \Omega^2 I_{ijk} - \Omega_i\Omega_\ell I_{\ell jk}  + 2\varepsilon_{i\ell m} \Omega_m \int_V \rho u_\ell x_j x_k \, d\mathbf x = -\delta_{ij}\Pi_k - \delta_{ik}\Pi_j$$

If the axis of rotation is chosen in $x_3$ direction, the equation becomes

$$W_{ij;k}  + W_{ik;j} + \Omega^2 (I_{ijk} - \delta_{i3} I_{3jk}) = -(\delta_{ij} \Pi_k + \delta_{ik} \Pi_j)$$

=== Steady state fourth order virial equation ===
With $x_3$ being the axis of rotation, the steady state fourth order virial equation is also derived by Chandrasekhar in 1968. The equation reads as

$$\frac{1}{3}(2 W_{ij;kl} + 2 W_{ik;lj} + 2 W_{il;jk} + W_{ij;k;l} + W_{ik;l;j} + W_{il;j;k}) + \Omega^2 (I_{ijkl} -\delta_{i3} I_{3jkl}) = - (\delta_{ij} \Pi_{kl} + \delta_{ik} \Pi_{lj} + \delta_{il} \Pi_{jk})$$

== Virial equations with viscous stresses ==
Considering the Navier-Stokes equations instead of the Euler equations,

$$\rho \frac{du_i}{dt} = - \frac{\partial p}{\partial x_i} + \rho \frac{\partial \Phi}{\partial x_i} + \frac{\partial \tau_{ik}}{\partial x_k}, \quad \text{where}\quad \tau_{ik} = \rho\nu\left(\frac{\partial u_i}{\partial x_k}+\frac{\partial u_k}{\partial x_i}-\frac{2}{3} \frac{\partial u_l}{\partial x_l}\delta_{ik}\right)$$

and we define the shear-energy tensor as

$$S_{ij} = \int_V \tau_{ij} d\mathbf{x}.$$

With the condition that the normal component of the total stress on the free surface must vanish, i.e., $(-p\delta_{ik}+\tau_{ik})n_k=0$, where $\mathbf{n}$ is the outward unit normal, the second order virial equation then be

$$\frac{1}{2}\frac{d^2I_{ij}}{dt^2} = 2T_{ij} + W_{ij} + \delta_{ij} \Pi - S_{ij}.$$

This can be easily extended to rotating frames of reference.

== See also ==
- Virial theorem
- Dirichlet's ellipsoidal problem
- Chandrasekhar tensor
