= Chandrasekhar potential energy tensor =

In astrophysics, Chandrasekhar potential energy tensor provides the gravitational potential of a body due to its own gravity created by the distribution of matter across the body, named after the Indian American astrophysicist Subrahmanyan Chandrasekhar. The Chandrasekhar tensor is a generalization of potential energy in other words, the trace of the Chandrasekhar tensor provides the potential energy of the body.

== Definition ==
The Chandrasekhar potential energy tensor is defined as

$$W_{ij} = -\frac{1}{2} \int_V \rho \Phi_{ij} d\mathbf{x} =\int_V \rho x_i \frac{\partial \Phi}{\partial x_j} d\mathbf{x}$$

where

$$\Phi_{ij}(\mathbf{x}) = G \int_V \rho(\mathbf{x'}) \frac{(x_i-x_i')(x_j-x_j')}{|\mathbf{x}-\mathbf{x'}|^3} d\mathbf{x'}, \quad \Rightarrow \quad \Phi_{ii} = \Phi = G \int_V \frac{\rho(\mathbf{x'})}{|\mathbf{x}-\mathbf{x'}|} d\mathbf{x'}$$

where

- $G$ is the Gravitational constant
- $\Phi(\mathbf{x})$ is the self-gravitating potential from Newton's law of gravity
- $\Phi_{ij}$ is the generalized version of $\Phi$
- $\rho(\mathbf{x})$ is the matter density distribution
- $V$ is the volume of the body

It is evident that $W_{ij}$ is a symmetric tensor from its definition. The trace of the Chandrasekhar tensor $W_{ij}$ is nothing but the potential energy $W$.

$$W= W_{ii} = -\frac{1}{2} \int_V \rho \Phi d\mathbf{x} = \int_V \rho x_i \frac{\partial \Phi}{\partial x_i} d\mathbf{x}$$

Hence Chandrasekhar tensor can be viewed as the generalization of potential energy.

== Chandrasekhar's Proof ==
Consider a matter of volume $V$ with density $\rho(\mathbf{x})$. Thus

$$\begin{align}
W_{ij} &= -\frac{1}{2} \int_V \rho \Phi_{ij} d\mathbf{x} \\
&= - \frac{1}{2} G \int_V \int_V \rho(\mathbf{x})\rho(\mathbf{x'}) \frac{(x_i-x_i')(x_j-x_j')}{|\mathbf{x}-\mathbf{x'}|^3}d\mathbf{x'}d\mathbf{x} \\
&= -G \int_V \int_V \rho(\mathbf{x})\rho(\mathbf{x'}) \frac{x_i(x_j-x_j')}{|\mathbf{x}-\mathbf{x'}|^3}d\mathbf{x}d\mathbf{x'} \\
&=  G \int_V  d\mathbf{x}\rho(\mathbf{x})x_i \frac{\partial}{\partial x_j} \int_V d\mathbf{x'} \frac{\rho(\mathbf{x'})}{|\mathbf{x}-\mathbf{x'}|}\\
&=  \int_V \rho x_i \frac{\partial \Phi}{\partial x_j} d\mathbf{x}
\end{align}$$

== Chandrasekhar tensor in terms of scalar potential ==
The scalar potential is defined as

$$\chi(\mathbf{x}) = -G \int_V \rho(\mathbf{x'}) |\mathbf{x}-\mathbf{x'}|d\mathbf{x'}$$

then Chandrasekhar proves that

$$W_{ij} = \delta_{ij} W + \frac{\partial^2 \chi}{\partial x_i\partial x_j}$$

Setting $i=j$ we get $\nabla^2\chi = -2W$, taking Laplacian again, we get $\nabla^4\chi = 8\pi G \rho$.

== See also ==
- Virial theorem
- Chandrasekhar virial equations
