= Chandrasekhar–Fermi method =

Astrophysics equation

Chandrasekhar–Fermi method or CF method or Davis–Chandrasekhar–Fermi method is a method that is used to calculate the mean strength of the interstellar magnetic field that is projected on the plane of the sky. The method was described by Leverett Davis Jr in 1951 and independently by Subrahmanyan Chandrasekhar and Enrico Fermi in 1953. According to this method, the magnetic field $B$ in the plane of the sky is given by

$$B = Q\sqrt{4\pi\rho} \frac{\delta v}{\delta \phi}$$

where $\rho$ is the mass density, $\delta v$ is the line-of-sight velocity dispersion and $\delta \phi$ is the dispersion of polarization angles and $Q$ is an order unity factor, which is typically taken it to be $Q\approx 0.5$. The method is also employed for prestellar molecular clouds.
