= Chandrasekhar polarization =

Chandrasekhar Polarization is a partial polarization of emergent radiation at the limb of rapidly rotating early-type stars or binary star system with purely electron-scattering atmosphere, named after the Indian American astrophysicist Subrahmanyan Chandrasekhar, who first predicted its existence theoretically in 1946.

Chandrasekhar published a series of 26 papers in The Astrophysical Journal titled On the Radiative Equilibrium of a Stellar Atmosphere from 1944 to 1948. In the 10th paper, he predicted that the purely electron stellar atmosphere emits a polarized light using Thomson law of scattering. The theory predicted that 11 percent polarization could be observed at maximum. But when this is applied to a spherical star, the net polarization effect was found to be zero, because of the spherical symmetry. But it took another 20 years to explain under what conditions this polarization can be observed. J. Patrick Harrington and George W. Collins, II showed that this symmetry is broken if we consider a rapidly rotating star (or a binary star system), in which the star is not exactly spherical, but slightly oblate due to extreme rotation (or tidal distortion in the case of binary system). The symmetry is also broken in eclipsing binary star system.

== Discovery ==
Attempts made to predict this polarization effect were initially unsuccessful, but rather led to the prediction of interstellar polarization. In 1983, scientists found the first evidence of this polarization effect on the star Algol, an eclipsing binary-star system.

The polarization on rapidly rotating star was not found until 2017 since it required a high-precision polarimeter. In September 2017, a team of scientists from Australia observed this polarization on the star Regulus, which rotates at 96.5 percent of its critical angular velocity for breakup.

== See also ==
- Polarization in astronomy
