= Schönberg–Chandrasekhar limit =

Ratio in stellar astrophysics

In stellar astrophysics, the Schönberg–Chandrasekhar limit is the maximum mass of a non-fusing, isothermal core that can support an enclosing envelope. It is expressed as the ratio of the core mass to the total mass of the core and envelope. Estimates of the limit depend on the models used and the assumed chemical compositions of the core and envelope; typical values given are from 0.10 to 0.15 (10% to 15% of the total stellar mass). This is the maximum to which a helium-filled core can grow, and if this limit is exceeded, as can only happen in massive stars, the core collapses, releasing energy that causes the outer layers of the star to expand to become a red giant. It is named after the astrophysicists Subrahmanyan Chandrasekhar and Mario Schönberg, who estimated its value in a 1942 paper. They estimated it to be:
$${\left(\frac{M_\text{c}}{M}\right)}_\text{SC} = 0.37 \left(\frac{\mu_\text{e}}{\mu_\text{c}}\right)^2 ,$$
where $M$ is the mass, $\operatorname{\mu}$ is the mean molecular weight, subscript $\text{c}$ denotes the core, and subscript $\text{e}$ denotes the envelope.

The Schönberg–Chandrasekhar limit comes into play when fusion in a main-sequence star exhausts the hydrogen at the center of the star. The star then contracts until hydrogen fuses in a shell surrounding a helium-rich core, both of which are surrounded by an envelope consisting primarily of hydrogen. The core increases in mass as the shell burns its way outwards through the star. If the star's mass is less than approximately 1.5 solar masses, the core will become degenerate before the Schönberg–Chandrasekhar limit is reached, and, on the other hand, if the mass is greater than approximately 6 solar masses, the star leaves the main sequence with a core mass already greater than the Schönberg–Chandrasekhar limit so its core is never isothermal before helium fusion. In the remaining case, where the mass is between 1.5 and 6 solar masses, the core will grow until the limit is reached, at which point it will contract rapidly until helium starts to fuse in the core.
