= Chandrasekhar–Friedman–Schutz instability =

Chandrasekhar–Friedman–Schutz instability or shortly CFS instability refers to an instability that can occur in rapidly rotating stars with which the instability arises for cases where the gravitational radiation reaction is unable to cope with the change in angular momentum associated with the perturbations. The instability was discovered by Subrahmanyan Chandrasekhar in 1970 and later a simple intuitive explanation for the instability was provided by John L. Friedman and Bernard F. Schutz. Specifically, the instability arises when a non-axisymmetric perturbation mode that appears co-rotating in the inertial frame (from which gravitational waves are observed), is in fact is counter-rotating with respect to the rotating star.

== Roberts–Stewartson instability and CFS instability ==
Although it has been anticipated a long time (1883) ago by William Thomson (later Lord Kelvin) and Peter Guthrie Tait in their book Treatise on Natural Philosophy that a small presence of viscosity in a rotating, self-gravitating, otherwise ideal fluid mass would lose its stability, it is shown to be true only much later by Paul H. Roberts and Keith Stewartson in 1963. Similar to how an energy dissipation by viscosity will lead to loss of stability, Chandrasekhar showed that the dissipation by the gravitational radiation reaction would also lead to a loss of stability, although such an instability is unprecedented in a non-rotating star.

The instability that arises only when there is a dissipation, but disappears in the absence of dissipation is referred to as the secular instability. Both the Roberts–Stewartson instability and CFS instability are secular instability, although they do not both correspond to same modes in the following sense: In the absence of radiation reaction and viscosity, the Maclaurin spheroid (a model for rotating, self-gravitating body) becomes marginally or neutrally stable when its eccentricity reaches a critical value with two possible neutral modes, but it does not become unstable after this bifurcation. It is only in the presence of dissipation, Maclaurin spheroid becomes unstable when eccentricity exceeds its bifurcation value. The Roberts–Stewartson instability stems from one of the neutral mode, whereas the CFS instability stems from the other neutral mode.
