= Subrahmanyan Chandrasekhar =

Indian-American astrophysicist (1910–1995)

Subrahmanyan Chandrasekhar FRS
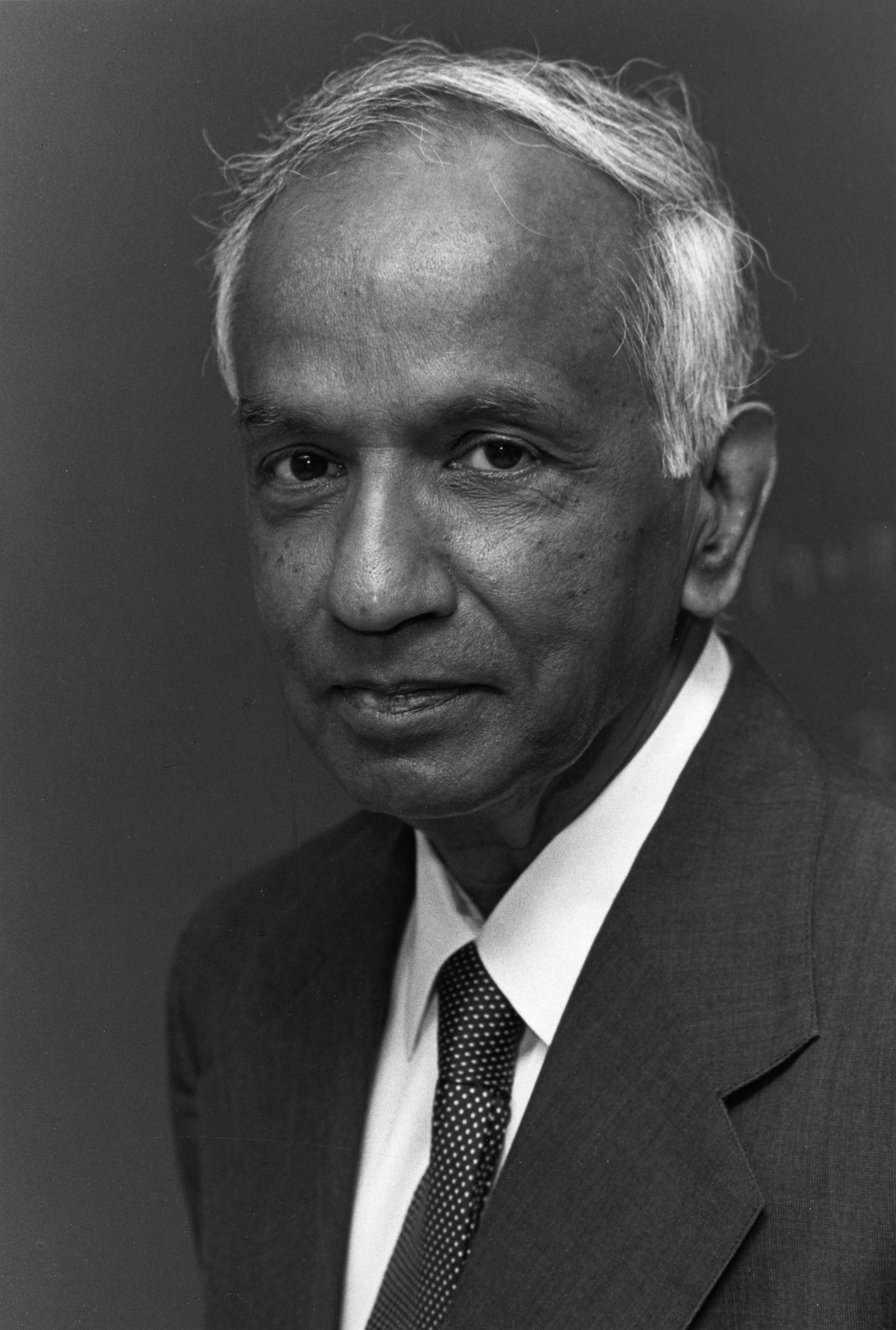
- Born: 19 October 1910; Lahore, Punjab, British Raj
- Died: 21 August 1995 (aged 84); Chicago, Illinois, U.S.
- Citizenship: India (1910–1947); India (1947–1953); United States (1953–1995)
- Education: University of Madras (BSc); Trinity College, Cambridge (MSc, PhD)
- Known for: Chandrasekhar limit; Chandrasekhar number; Chandrasekhar friction; Emden–Chandrasekhar equation; Chandrasekhar–Fermi method; Chandrasekhar–Friedman–Schutz instability; Chandrasekhar–Page equations; Chandrasekhar waves; Batchelor–Chandrasekhar equation; Kramers–Chandrasekhar equation; Chandrasekhar–Kendall function; Chandrasekhar's H-function; Chandrasekhar transformation; Chandrasekhar tensor; Chandrasekhar virial equations; Schönberg–Chandrasekhar limit; Chandrasekhar's white dwarf equation; Chandrasekhar polarization; Chandrasekhar algorithm; Chandrasekhar's X- and Y-function; Discrete ordinates method; Others in list form
- Spouse: Lalitha Doraiswamy (m. 1936)
- Family: Chandrasekhar family
- Awards: FRS (1944); Adams Prize (1948); Nobel Prize in Physics (1983); Copley Medal (1984); National Medal of Science (1966); Royal Medal (1962); Padma Vibhushan (1968); Heineman Prize (1974); Marcel Grossman Award (1994)
- Scientific career
- Fields: Astrophysics; General relativity Fluid dynamics Radiation; Quantum theory
- Workplaces: University of Chicago; Yerkes Observatory; Ballistic Research Laboratory; University of Cambridge
- Thesis: Polytropic distributions (1933)
- Doctoral advisor: Ralph H. Fowler; Arthur Eddington
- Doctoral students: Donald Edward Osterbrock; Guido Münch; Roland Winston; Jeremiah P. Ostriker; Jerome Kristian; Yousef Sobouti; Anne Barbara Underhill; Arthur Code; Surindar Kumar Trehan

Signature
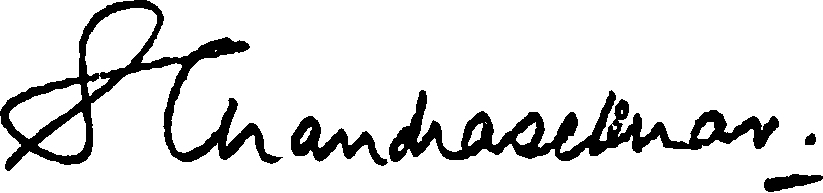

Subrahmanyan Chandrasekhar (Note: /ˌtʃəndrəˈʃeɪkər/ CHƏN-drə-SHAY-kər; Tamil: சுப்பிரமணியன் சந்திரசேகர், romanized: Cuppiramaṇiyaṉ Cantiracēkar) (19 October 1910 – 21 August 1995) was an Indian-American astrophysicist. He shared the 1983 Nobel Prize in Physics "for his theoretical studies of the physical processes of importance to the structure and evolution of the stars." His mathematical treatment of stellar evolution yielded many of the current theoretical models of the later evolutionary stages of massive stars. The Chandrasekhar limit describes the maximum mass of a white dwarf (1.44 solar masses). Above it, a stellar remnant will collapse to form a neutron star or black hole. Many concepts, institutions and inventions, including the Chandra X-Ray Observatory, are named after him.

Born in the late British Raj, Chandrasekhar worked on a wide variety of problems in physics during his lifetime, contributing to the contemporary understanding of stellar structure, white dwarfs, stellar dynamics, stochastic process, radiative transfer, the quantum theory of the hydrogen anion, hydrodynamic and hydromagnetic stability, turbulence, equilibrium and the stability of ellipsoidal figures of equilibrium, general relativity, mathematical theory of black holes and theory of colliding gravitational waves. At the University of Cambridge, he developed a theoretical model explaining the structure of white dwarf stars that took into account the relativistic variation of mass with the velocities of electrons that comprise their degenerate matter. Chandrasekhar revised the models of stellar dynamics first outlined by Jan Oort and others by considering the effects of fluctuating gravitational fields within the Milky Way on stars rotating about the galactic center. His solution to this complex dynamical problem involved a set of twenty partial differential equations, describing a new quantity he termed "dynamical friction", which has the dual effects of decelerating the star and helping to stabilize clusters of stars. Chandrasekhar extended this analysis to the interstellar medium, showing that clouds of galactic gas and dust are distributed very unevenly.

Chandrasekhar studied at Presidency College, Madras (now Chennai) and the University of Cambridge. A longtime professor at the University of Chicago, he did some of his studies at the Yerkes Observatory, and served as editor of The Astrophysical Journal from 1952 to 1971. He was on the faculty at Chicago from 1937 until his death in 1995 at the age of 84, and was the Morton D. Hull Distinguished Service Professor of Theoretical Astrophysics.

== Early life and education ==
Chandrasekhar was born in Lahore on 19 October 1910 of the British Raj (present-day Pakistan) into a Tamil Brahmin family, to Sita Balakrishnan and C. Subrahmanya Ayyar, who was stationed in Lahore as Deputy Auditor General of the Northwestern Railways at the time of Chandrasekhar's birth. Chandra, as Chandrasekhar was known, had two elder sisters, Rajalakshmi and Balaparvathi, three younger brothers, Vishwanathan, Balakrishnan, and Ramanathan, and four younger sisters, Sarada, Vidya, Savitri, and Sundari. His paternal uncle was the Indian physicist and Nobel laureate C. V. Raman. His mother was devoted to intellectual pursuits, had translated Henrik Ibsen's A Doll's House into Tamil and is credited with arousing Chandra's intellectual curiosity at an early age. The family moved from Lahore to Allahabad in 1916, and finally settled in Madras in 1918.

Chandrasekhar was tutored at home until the age of 12. In middle school his father taught him mathematics and physics and his mother taught him Tamil. He attended the Hindu High School, Triplicane, Madras in 1922–25. From 1925 to 1930, he studied at Presidency College, Madras (affiliated to the University of Madras), writing his first paper, "The Compton Scattering and the New Statistics", in 1929 after being inspired by a lecture by Arnold Sommerfeld. He obtained his bachelor's degree, BSc (Hon.), in physics, in June 1930. In July 1930, Chandrasekhar was awarded a Government of India scholarship to pursue graduate studies at the University of Cambridge, where he was admitted to Trinity College. The scholarship was secured by Ralph H. Fowler, to whom Chandrasekhar had sent his first paper. During his travels to England, Chandrasekhar spent his time working out the statistical mechanics of the degenerate electron gas in white dwarf stars, providing relativistic corrections to Fowler's previous work (see Legacy below).

== University of Cambridge ==
In his first year at Cambridge, as a research student of Fowler, Chandrasekhar spent his time calculating mean opacities and applying his results to the construction of an improved model for the limiting mass of a degenerate star. At the meetings of the Royal Astronomical Society, he met E. A. Milne. At the invitation of Max Born he spent the summer of 1931, his second year of post-graduate studies, at Born's institute at Göttingen, working on opacities, atomic absorption coefficients, and model stellar photospheres. On the advice of Paul Dirac, he spent his final year of graduate studies (September 1932 to May 1933) at the Institute for Theoretical Physics in Copenhagen, where he met Niels Bohr. At Copenhagen, he became friends with Victor Weisskopf, Léon Rosenfeld, George Placzek and Max Delbrück as they were all living in the same pension.

After receiving a bronze medal for his work on degenerate stars, Chandrasekhar was awarded his PhD degree at Cambridge in the summer of 1933, with a thesis on rotating self-gravitating polytropes. On 9 October, he was elected to a Prize Fellowship at Trinity College for the period 1933–1937, becoming only the second Indian to receive a Trinity Fellowship after Srinivasa Ramanujan 16 years earlier. He had been so certain of failing to obtain the fellowship that he had already made arrangements to study under Milne that autumn at Oxford, even going to the extent of renting a flat there.

In 1934, Chandrasekhar visited Leningrad, Russia and met other astrophysicists including Viktor Ambartsumian and Nikolai Aleksandrovich Kozyrev. He also met Lev Landau.

During this time, Chandrasekhar became acquainted with British physicist Sir Arthur Eddington. Eddington took an interest in his work, but in January, 1935, gave a talk severely criticizing Chandrasekhar's work (see #Dispute with Eddington and Chandrasekhar–Eddington dispute).

== Career and research ==
Chandrasekhar in 1934

=== Early career ===
In 1935, Chandrasekhar was invited by the director of the Harvard Observatory, Harlow Shapley, to be a visiting lecturer in theoretical astrophysics for a three-month period. He travelled to the United States in December. During his visit to Harvard, Chandrasekhar greatly impressed Shapley, but declined his offer of a Harvard research fellowship. At the same time, Chandrasekhar met Gerard Kuiper, a noted Dutch astrophysical observationalist who was then a leading authority on white dwarfs. Kuiper had recently been recruited by Otto Struve, the director of the Yerkes Observatory in Williams Bay, Wisconsin, which was run by the University of Chicago, and the university's president, Robert Maynard Hutchins. Having known of Chandrasekhar, Struve was then considering him for one of three faculty posts in astrophysics, along with Kuiper; the other opening had been filled by Bengt Stromgren, a Danish theorist. Following a recommendation from Kuiper, Struve invited Chandrasekhar to Yerkes in March 1936 and offered him the job. Though Chandrasekhar was keenly interested, he initially declined the offer and left for England; after Hutchins sent a radiogram to Chandrasekhar during the voyage, he finally accepted, returning to Yerkes as an assistant professor of Theoretical Astrophysics in December 1936. Hutchins also intervened on an occasion where Chandra's participation on teaching a course organised by Struve, was vetoed by the dean Henry Gale based on a racial prejudice; Hutchins said "By all means have Mr. Chandrasekhar teach".

Chandrasekhar remained at the University of Chicago for the rest of his career, 1937-1995. He was promoted to associate professor in 1941 and to full professor two years later at the age of 33. In 1946, when Princeton University offered Chandrasekhar a position vacated by Henry Norris Russell with a salary double that of Chicago's, Hutchins incremented his salary matching with that of Princeton's and persuaded Chandrasekhar to stay in Chicago. In 1952, he became the Morton D. Hull Distinguished Service Professor of Theoretical Astrophysics and Enrico Fermi Institute, upon Enrico Fermi's invitation. In 1953, he and his wife, Lalitha Chandrasekhar, took American citizenship.

After the Laboratory for Astrophysics and Space Research (LASR) was built by NASA in 1966 at the university, Chandrasekhar occupied one of the four corner offices on the second floor. (The other corners housed John A. Simpson, Peter Meyer, and Eugene N. Parker.) Chandrasekhar lived at 4800 Lake Shore Drive after the high-rise apartment complex was built in the late 1960s, and later at 5550 Dorchester Building.

=== Dispute with Eddington ===
After graduating from Cambridge, Chandrasekhar, who was in close contact with Arthur Eddington, presented a full solution to his stellar equation at the Royal Astronomical Society meeting in 1935. Eddington booked a talk right after Chandrasekhar, where he openly criticized Chandrasekhar's theory. This depressed Chandrasekhar and sparked a scientific dispute. Eddington refused to accept a limit for the mass of a star and proposed an alternative model.

Chandrasekhar sought support from prominent physicists like Léon Rosenfeld, Niels Bohr and Christian Møller who found Eddington's arguments lacking. The tension persisted through 1930s, as Eddington continued to openly criticize Chandrasekhar during meetings and the two compared each other's theories in publications. Chandrasekhar ultimately completed his theory of white dwarfs in 1939, receiving praise from others in the field. Eddington died in 1944, and despite their disagreements, Chandrasekhar continued to state that he admired Eddington and considered him a friend.

=== World War II ===
During World War II, Chandrasekhar worked at the Ballistic Research Laboratory at the Aberdeen Proving Ground in Maryland. While there, he worked on problems of ballistics, resulting in reports such as 1943's On the decay of plane shock waves, Optimum height for the bursting of a 105mm shell, On the Conditions for the Existence of Three Shock Waves, On the Determination of the Velocity of a Projectile from the Beat Waves Produced by Interference with the Waves of Modified Frequency Reflected from the Projectile and The normal reflection of a blast wave. Chandrasekhar's expertise in hydrodynamics led Robert Oppenheimer to invite him to join the Manhattan Project at Los Alamos, but delays in the processing of his security clearance prevented him from contributing to the project. It has been rumoured that he visited the Calutron project.

=== Philosophy of systematization ===
He wrote that his scientific research was motivated by his desire to participate in the progress of different subjects in science to the best of his ability, and that the prime motive underlying his work was systematization. "What a scientist tries to do essentially is to select a certain domain, a certain aspect, or a certain detail, and see if that takes its appropriate place in a general scheme which has form and coherence; and, if not, to seek further information which would help him to do that".

Chandrasekhar developed a unique style of mastering several fields of physics and astrophysics; consequently, his working life can be divided into distinct periods. He would exhaustively study a specific area, publish several papers in it and then write a book summarizing the major concepts in the field. He would then move on to another field for the next decade and repeat the pattern. Thus he studied stellar structure, including the theory of white dwarfs, during the years 1929 to 1939, and subsequently focused on stellar dynamics, theory of Brownian motion from 1939 to 1943. Next, he concentrated on the theory of radiative transfer and the quantum theory of the negative ion of hydrogen from 1943 to 1950. This was followed by sustained work on turbulence and hydrodynamic and hydromagnetic stability from 1950 to 1961. In the 1960s, he studied both the equilibrium and the stability of ellipsoidal figures of equilibrium, and general relativity. During the period, 1971 to 1983 he studied the mathematical theory of black holes, and, finally, during the late 80s, he worked on the theory of colliding gravitational waves.

=== Work with students ===
Chandrasekhar worked closely with his students and expressed pride in the fact that over a 50-year period (from roughly 1930 to 1980), the average age of his co-author collaborators had remained the same, around 30. He insisted that students address him as "Professor Chandrasekhar" until they received their PhD degree, after which they (as other colleagues) were encouraged to call him "Chandra". When he was working at the Yerkes Observatory in 1940s, he drove 150 miles (240 km) each way every weekend to teach a course at the University of Chicago. Two of the students who took the course, Tsung-Dao Lee and Chen-Ning Yang, won the Nobel prize before Chandrasekhar did. Of classroom interactions during his lectures, astronomer Carl Sagan said that "frivolous questions" from unprepared students were "dealt with in the manner of a summary execution", while questions of merit "were given serious attention and response". Sagan recalled, "I discovered what true mathematical elegance is from Subrahmanyan Chandrasekhar."

=== Other activities ===
From 1952 to 1971 Chandrasekhar was editor of The Astrophysical Journal. When Eugene Parker submitted a paper on his discovery of solar wind in 1957, two eminent reviewers rejected the paper. However, since Chandra as an editor could not find any mathematical flaws in Parker's work, he went ahead and published the paper in 1958.

During the years 1990 to 1995, Chandrasekhar worked on a project devoted to explaining the detailed geometric arguments in Sir Isaac Newton's Philosophiae Naturalis Principia Mathematica using the language and methods of ordinary calculus. The effort resulted in the book Newton's Principia for the Common Reader, published in 1995.

Chandrasekhar also worked on collision of gravitational waves, and algebraically special perturbations. He had a strong interest in literature and the arts. In 1975, he lectured on patterns of creativity in Shakespeare, Beethoven and Newton.

== Personal life ==
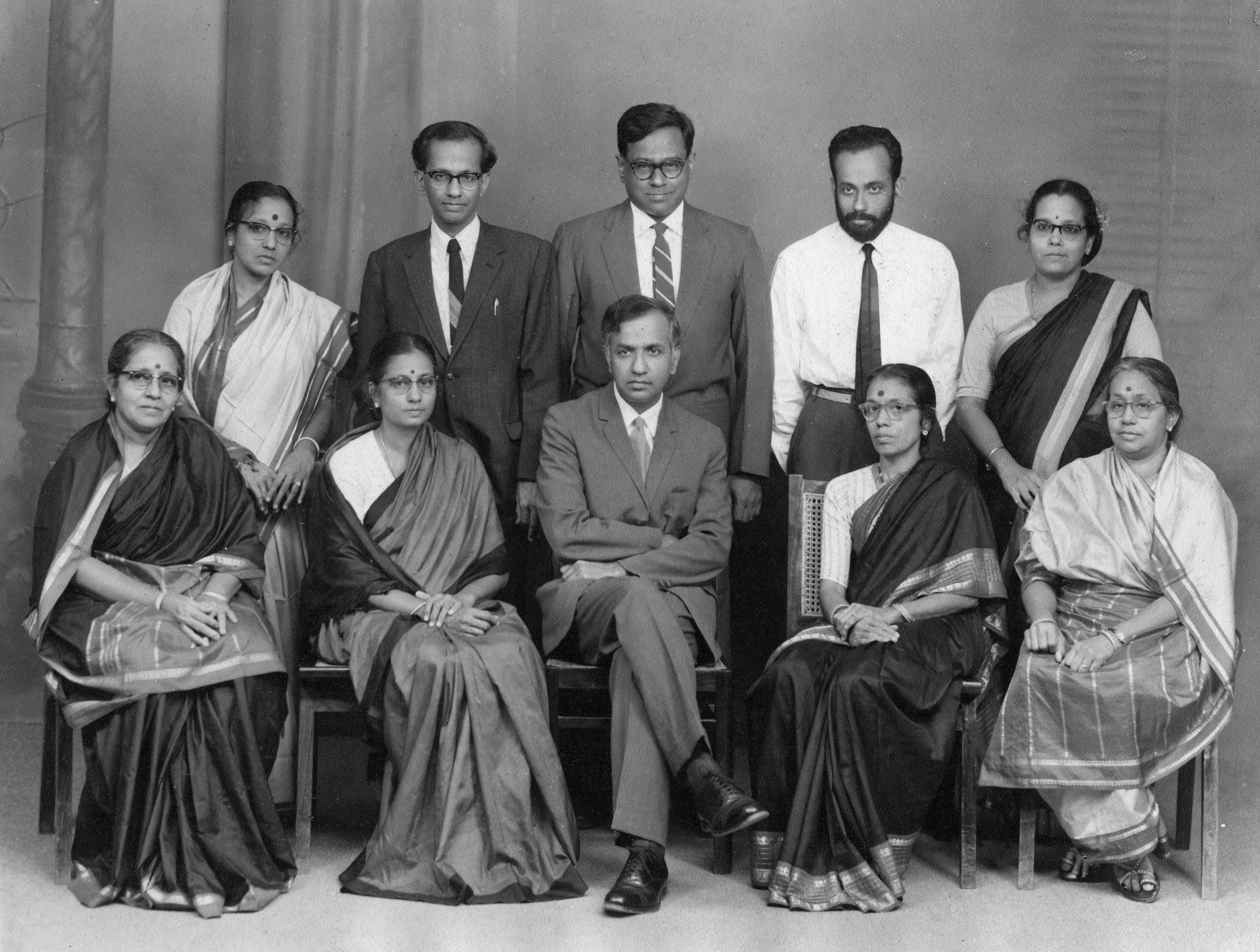
S. Chandrasekhar with his brothers and sisters in Madras [Chennai], India. From left to right seated are: Bala, Savitri, Chandra, Sarada, Rajam; standing: Vidya, Balakrishnan, Vishwam, Ramanathan, Sundari.

Chandrasekhar was the nephew of C. V. Raman, who was awarded the Nobel Prize for Physics in 1930.

Chandrasekhar married Lalitha Doraiswamy in September 1936. He met her as a fellow physics student at Presidency College. Doraiswamy's enthusiasm for physics mainly came from her interest in Marie Curie and India awarding the Nobel Prize in Physics to C. V. Raman. She wanted to continue her studies in England, but her mother did not agree to this, which led Doraiswamy to earn an LT (teaching degree) from the University of Madras and Lady Willingdon Training College in 1932. She spent the next few years teaching physics, chemistry, math, and physical education at various institutions. She earned her master's degree in physics from Presidency College in 1934. Doraiswamy eventually gave up her studies to focus on supporting her husband's career by primarily managing their household so he could focus on his work.

Chandrasekhar became a naturalized citizen of the U.S. in 1953. Many considered him warm, positive, generous, unassuming, meticulous, and open to debate, while others found him private, intimidating, impatient and stubborn about non-scientific matters, and unforgiving to those who ridiculed his work. Chandrasekhar was a vegetarian.

Chandrasekhar died of a heart attack at the University of Chicago Hospital in 1995 after surviving a heart attack in 1975. He was survived by his wife, who died on 2 September 2013 at the age of 102. She was a serious student of literature and western classical music.

In a discussion of the Bhagavad Gita, Chandrasekhar once said: "I should like to preface my remarks with a personal statement in order that my later remarks will not be misunderstood. I consider myself an atheist". This was also confirmed many times in his other talks. Kameshwar C. Wali quoted him saying: "I am not religious in any sense; in fact, I consider myself an atheist." In an October 1987 interview, Chandrasekhar said: "Of course, he (Otto Struve) knew I was an atheist, and he never brought up the subject with me". In deference to Chandrasekhar's atheistic views, his wife refrained from displaying the small religious icons of deities she had brought with her.

== Awards, honours and legacy ==
=== Nobel prize ===
Chandrasekhar shared the Nobel Prize in Physics in 1983 for his studies on the physical processes important to the structure and evolution of stars. Chandrasekhar accepted this honour, but was upset the citation mentioned only his earliest work, seeing it as a denigration of a lifetime's achievement. He shared it with William A. Fowler.

=== Other awards and honors ===
- Elected a Fellow of the Royal Society (FRS) in 1944
- American Philosophical Society, Member (1945)
- American Academy of Arts and Sciences, Member (1946)
- Henry Norris Russell Lectureship (1949)
- Bruce Medal (1952)
- Gold Medal of the Royal Astronomical Society (1953)
- United States National Academy of Sciences, Member (1955)
- Rumford Prize of the American Academy of Arts and Sciences (1957)
- National Medal of Science, USA (1966)
- Padma Vibhushan (1968)
- Henry Draper Medal of the National Academy of Sciences (1971)
- Marian Smoluchowski Medal (1973)
- Copley Medal of the Royal Society (1984)
- Gordon J. Laing Award (1989)
- Golden Plate Award of the American Academy of Achievement (1990)
- Jansky Lectureship before the National Radio Astronomy Observatory

=== Legacy ===
Chandrasekhar's most notable work is on the astrophysical Chandrasekhar limit. The limit gives the maximum mass of a white dwarf star, ~1.44 solar masses, or equivalently, the minimum mass that must be exceeded for a star to collapse into a neutron star or black hole (following a supernova). The limit was first calculated by Chandrasekhar in 1930 during his maiden voyage from India to Cambridge, England for his graduate studies. In 1979, NASA named the third of its four "Great Observatories" after Chandrasekhar. This followed a naming contest which attracted 6,000 entries from fifty states and sixty-one countries. The Chandra X-ray Observatory was launched and deployed by Space Shuttle Columbia on 23 July 1999. The Chandrasekhar number, an important dimensionless number of magnetohydrodynamics, is named after him. The asteroid 1958 Chandra is also named after Chandrasekhar. The Himalayan Chandra Telescope is named after him. In the Biographical Memoirs of Fellows of the Royal Society of London, R. J. Tayler wrote: "Chandrasekhar was a classical applied mathematician whose research was primarily applied in astronomy and whose like will probably never be seen again."

Chandrasekhar supervised 45 PhD students. After his death, his wife Lalitha Chandrasekhar made a gift of his Nobel Prize money to the University of Chicago towards the establishment of the Subrahmanyan Chandrasekhar Memorial Fellowship. First awarded in the year 2000, this fellowship is given annually to an outstanding applicant to graduate school in the PhD programs of the department of physics or the department of astronomy and astrophysics. S. Chandrasekhar Prize of Plasma Physics is an award given by Association of Asia Pacific Physical Societies (AAPS) to outstanding plasma physicists, started in the year 2014.

The Chandra Astrophysics Institute (CAI) is a program offered for high school students who are interested in astrophysics mentored by MIT scientists and sponsored by the Chandra X-ray Observatory.

In 2010, on account of Chandra's 100th birthday, University of Chicago conducted a symposium titled Chandrasekhar Centennial Symposium 2010 which was attended by leading astrophysicists such as Roger Penrose, Kip Thorne, Freeman Dyson, Jayant V. Narlikar, Rashid Sunyaev, G. Srinivasan, and Clifford Will. Its research talks were published in 2011 as a book titled Fluid flows to Black Holes: A tribute to S Chandrasekhar on his birth centenary.

On 19 October 2017, Chandrasekhar was celebrated in a Google Doodle honouring his 107th birthday.

== Publications ==
=== Books ===
- Chandrasekhar, S. (2010) [1939/58]. An Introduction to the Study of Stellar Structure. New York: Dover. ISBN 978-0-486-60413-8.
- Chandrasekhar, S. (2005) [1942]. Principles of Stellar Dynamics. New York: Dover. ISBN 978-0-486-44273-0.
- Chandrasekhar, S. (2011) [1950/1960]. Radiative Transfer. New York: Dover. ISBN 978-0-486-60590-6.
- Chandrasekhar, S. (1975) [1960]. Plasma Physics. Chicago: The University of Chicago Press. ISBN 978-0-226-10084-5.
- Chandrasekhar, S. (1981) [1961]. Hydrodynamic and Hydromagnetic Stability. New York: Dover. ISBN 978-0-486-64071-6.
- Chandrasekhar, S. (1987) [1969]. Ellipsoidal Figures of Equilibrium. New York: Dover. ISBN 978-0-486-65258-0.
- Chandrasekhar, S. (1998) [1983]. The Mathematical Theory of Black Holes. New York: Oxford University Press. ISBN 978-0-19-850370-5.
- Chandrasekhar, S. (1983) [1983]. Eddington: The Most Distinguished Astrophysicist of His Time. Cambridge University Press. ISBN 978-0-521-25746-6.
- Chandrasekhar, S. (1990) [1987]. Truth and Beauty. Aesthetics and Motivations in Science. Chicago: The University of Chicago Press. ISBN 978-0-226-10087-6.
- Chandrasekhar, S. (1995). Newton's Principia for the Common Reader. Oxford: Clarendon Press. ISBN 978-0-19-851744-3.
- Spiegel, E.A. (2011) [1954]. The Theory of Turbulence: Subrahmanyan Chandrasekhar's 1954 Lectures. Netherlands: Springer. ISBN 978-94-007-0117-5.

=== Notes ===
- Chandrasekhar, S. (1939). "The Dynamics of Stellar Systems. I–VIII". The Astrophysical Journal. 90 (1): 1–154. Bibcode:1939ApJ....90....1C. doi:10.1086/144094. ISSN 0004-637X.
- Chandrasekhar, S. (1943). "Stochastic Problems in Physics and Astronomy". Reviews of Modern Physics. 15 (1): 1–89. Bibcode:1943RvMP...15....1C. doi:10.1103/RevModPhys.15.1. ISSN 0034-6861.
- Chandrasekhar, S. (1993). Classical general relativity. Royal Society.
- Chandrasekhar, S. (1979). The Role of General Relativity: Retrospect and Prospect. Proc. IAU Meeting.
- Chandrasekhar, S. (1943). New methods in stellar dynamics. New York Academy of Sciences.
- Chandrasekhar, S. (1954). "The illumination and polarization of the sunlit sky on Rayleigh scattering". Transactions of the American Philosophical Society. 44 (6). American Philosophical Society: 643–728. doi:10.2307/1005777. JSTOR 1005777.
- Chandrasekhar, S. (1983). "On Stars, their evolution and their stability, Nobel lecture". Reviews of Modern Physics. 56 (2). Stockholm: Nobel Foundation: 137–147. doi:10.1103/RevModPhys.56.137.
- Chandrasekhar, S. (1981). New horizons of human knowledge: a series of public talks given at Unesco. Unesco Press.
- Chandrasekhar, S. (1975). "Shakespeare, Newton, and Beethoven: Or, Patterns of Creativity". Current Science. 70 (9). University of Chicago: 810–822. JSTOR 24099932.
- Chandrasekhar, S. (July 1973). "P.A.M. Dirac on his seventieth birthday". Contemporary Physics. 14 (4): 389–394. Bibcode:1973ConPh..14..389C. doi:10.1080/00107517308210761. ISSN 0010-7514.
- Chandrasekhar, S. (1947). Heywood, Robert B. (ed.). The Works of the Mind:The Scientist. Chicago: University of Chicago Press. pp. 159–179. OCLC 752682744.
- Chandrasekhar, S. (1995). Reminiscences and discoveries on Ramanujan's bust. Royal Society. ASIN B001B12NJ8.
- Chandrasekhar, S. (1990). How one may explore the physical content of the general theory of relativity. American Mathematical Society. ASIN B001B10QTM.

=== Journals ===
Chandrasekhar published around 380 papers in his lifetime. He wrote his first paper in 1928 when he was still an undergraduate student about Compton effect and last paper which was accepted for publication just two months before his death was in 1995 which was about non-radial oscillation of stars. The University of Chicago Press published selected papers of Chandrasekhar in seven volumes.

- Chandrasekhar, S. (1989). Selected Papers, Vol 1, Stellar structure and stellar atmospheres. Chicago: University of Chicago Press. ISBN 978-0-226-10089-0.
- Chandrasekhar, S. (1989). Selected Papers, Vol 2, Radiative transfer and negative ion of hydrogen. Chicago: University of Chicago Press. ISBN 978-0-226-10092-0.
- Chandrasekhar, S. (1989). Selected Papers, Vol 3, Stochastic, statistical and hydromagnetic problems in Physics and Astronomy. Chicago: University of Chicago Press. ISBN 978-0-226-10094-4.
- Chandrasekhar, S. (1989). Selected Papers, Vol 4, Plasma Physics, Hydrodynamic and Hydromagnetic stability, and applications of the Tensor-Virial theorem. Chicago: University of Chicago Press. ISBN 978-0-226-10097-5.
- Chandrasekhar, S. (1990). Selected Papers, Vol 5, Relativistic Astrophysics. Chicago: University of Chicago Press. ISBN 978-0-226-10098-2.
- Chandrasekhar, S. (1991). Selected Papers, Vol 6, The Mathematical Theory of Black Holes and of Colliding Plane Waves. Chicago: University of Chicago Press. ISBN 978-0-226-10101-9.
- Chandrasekhar, S. (1997). Selected Papers, Vol 7, The non-radial oscillations of star in General Relativity and other writings. Chicago: University of Chicago Press. ISBN 978-0-226-10104-0.
