= Timeline of stellar astronomy =

Timeline of stellar astronomy

- 1200 BC — Chinese star names appear on oracle bones used for divination.
- 134 BC — Hipparchus creates the magnitude scale of stellar apparent luminosities
- 185 AD — Chinese astronomers become the first to observe a supernova, the SN 185
- 964 — Abd al-Rahman al-Sufi (Azophi) writes the Book of Fixed Stars, in which he makes the first recorded observations of the Andromeda Galaxy and the Large Magellanic Cloud, and lists numerous stars with their positions, magnitudes, brightness, and colour, and gives drawings for each constellation
- 1000s (decade) — The Persian astronomer, Al-Biruni, describes the Milky Way galaxy as a collection of numerous nebulous stars
- 1006 — Ali ibn Ridwan and Chinese astronomers observe the SN 1006, the brightest stellar event ever recorded
- 1054 — Chinese and Arab astronomers observe the SN 1054, responsible for the creation of the Crab Nebula, the only nebula whose creation was observed
- 1181 — Chinese astronomers observe the SN 1181 supernova
- 1580 — Taqi al-Din measures the right ascension of the stars at the Constantinople observatory of Taqi ad-Din using an "observational clock" he invented and which he described as "a mechanical clock with three dials which show the hours, the minutes, and the seconds"
- 1596 — David Fabricius notices that Mira's brightness varies
- 1672 — Geminiano Montanari notices that Algol's brightness varies
- 1686 — Gottfried Kirch notices that Chi Cygni's brightness varies
- 1718 — Edmund Halley discovers stellar proper motions by comparing his astrometric measurements with those of the Greeks
- 1782 — John Goodricke notices that the brightness variations of Algol are periodic and proposes that it is partially eclipsed by a body moving around it
- 1784 — Edward Pigott discovers the first Cepheid variable star
- 1838 — Thomas Henderson, Friedrich Struve, and Friedrich Bessel measure stellar parallaxes
- 1844 — Friedrich Bessel explains the wobbling motions of Sirius and Procyon by suggesting that these stars have dark companions
- 1906 — Arthur Eddington begins his statistical study of stellar motions
- 1908 — Henrietta Leavitt discovers the Cepheid period–luminosity relation
- 1910 — Ejnar Hertzsprung and Henry Norris Russell study the relation between magnitudes and spectral types of stars
- 1922 — Annie Jump Cannons classification scheme of stars (OBAFGKM) is adopted by the International Astronomical Union
- 1924 — Arthur Eddington develops the main sequence mass-luminosity relationship
- 1925 — Cecilia Payne-Gaposchkin studies stellar spectra and finds that stars are mainly composed of Hydrogen and Helium
- 1929 — George Gamow proposes hydrogen fusion as the energy source for stars
- 1938 — Hans Bethe and Carl von Weizsäcker detail the proton–proton chain and CNO cycle in stars
- 1939 — Rupert Wildt realizes the importance of the negative hydrogen ion for stellar opacity
- 1952 — Walter Baade distinguishes between Cepheid I and Cepheid II variable stars
- 1953 — Fred Hoyle predicts a carbon-12 resonance to allow stellar triple alpha reactions at reasonable stellar interior temperatures
- 1961 — Chūshirō Hayashi publishes his work on the Hayashi track of fully convective stars
- 1963 — Fred Hoyle and William A. Fowler conceive the idea of supermassive stars
- 1964 — Subrahmanyan Chandrasekhar and Richard Feynman develop a general relativistic theory of stellar pulsations and show that supermassive stars are subject to a general relativistic instability
- 1967 — Eric Becklin and Gerry Neugebauer discover the Becklin-Neugebauer Object at 10 micrometres
- 1977 — (May 25) The Star Wars film is released and became a worldwide phenomenon, boosting interests in stellar systems.
- 2012 — (May 2) First visual proof of existence of black-holes. Suvi Gezari's team in Johns Hopkins University, using the Hawaiian telescope Pan-STARRS 1, publish images of a supermassive black hole 2.7 million light-years away swallowing a red giant.

== See also ==
- Timeline of astronomy
