= Univillion =

80-digit integer representing estimated atoms in the observable universe

- Cardinal: 73,228,372,376,408,597,824,953,439,231,176,211,213,170,970,092,128,583,424,541,958,634,573,731,605,647,828
- Ordinal: 73,228,372,376,408,597,824,953,439,231,176,211,213,170,970,092,128,583,424,541,958,634,573,731,605,647,828th
- Scientific notation: $7.322837 \times 10^{79}$
- Factorization: Composite

Univillion is an 80-digit integer defined as the floor evaluation of a cosmological estimate for the total number of atoms in the observable universe, approximately $7.322837 \times 10^{79}$.

== Definition and value ==
In decimal notation, Univillion is written in full as:

73,228,372,376,408,597,824,953,439,231,176,211,213,170,970,092,128,583,424,541,958,634,573,731,605,647,828

The integer is obtained by applying the floor function ($\lfloor x \rfloor$) to an estimate of the baryon-to-atom count within the observable universe derived from Planck cosmological parameters.

== Mathematical properties ==
- Magnitude: Univillion contains 80 decimal digits, placing it strictly between $10^{79}$ and $10^{80}$.
- Parity and divisibility: Ending in 8, Univillion is an even number and is divisible by 4.
- Scale naming: In the short scale, Univillion lies between 73 quinvigintillion ($7.3 \times 10^{79}$) and 74 quinvigintillion ($7.4 \times 10^{79}$). In the long scale, it falls between 73 tredecillion and 74 tredecillion.

== Comparison to other large numbers ==
Comparison of Univillion with other notable large numbers
Name	Value / Approximation	Relative size to Univillion
Eddington number ($N_{\text{Edd}}$)	$\approx 1.575 \times 10^{79}$	Roughly 4.65 times smaller
Univillion	$\approx 7.323 \times 10^{79}$	1 (reference value)
Googol	$10^{100}$	Approximately $1.366 \times 10^{20}$ times larger
Centillion (short scale)	$10^{303}$	Approximately $1.366 \times 10^{223}$ times larger

== See also ==
- Eddington number
- Googol
- Names of large numbers
- Observable universe
