= IK Tauri =

Mira variable star in the constellation Taurus

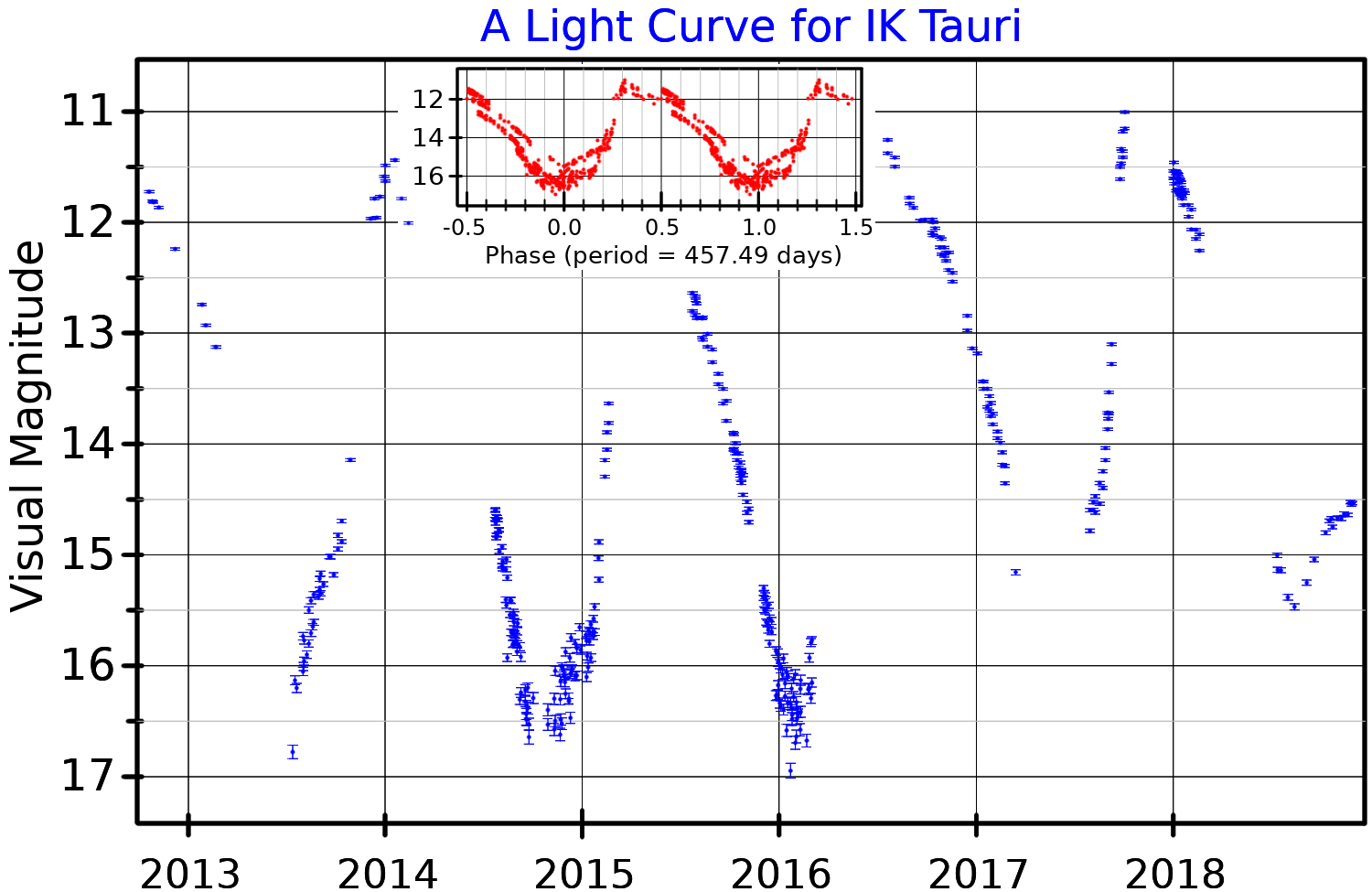
- A visual band light curve for IK Tauri, plotted from ASAS-SN data. The main plot shows the brightness as a function of time, and the inset shows the same data plotted as a function of pulsation phase.

Observation data Epoch J2000.0 Equinox ICRS
- Constellation: Taurus
- Right ascension: 03^{h} 53^{m} 28.87^{s}
- Declination: +11° 24′ 21.7″
- Apparent magnitude (V): 10.8 - 16.5

Characteristics
- Evolutionary stage: Asymptotic giant branch
- Spectral type: M6e - L0e
- Apparent magnitude (K): −1.24
- U−B color index: −0.04
- B−V color index: +3.64
- Variable type: Mira

Astrometry
Radial velocity (R_{v})	~46 km/s
Proper motion (μ)	RA: 32.806±0.799 mas/yr Dec.: −22.820±0.663 mas/yr
Parallax (π)	3.5114±0.3496 mas
Distance	930 ± 90 ly (280 ± 30 pc)

Details
Mass	1 - 1.5 M_{☉}
Radius	608 ± 66 R_{☉}
Luminosity	8,724±1,921 L_{☉}
Surface gravity (log g)	–0.95 cgs
Temperature	2,234±86 K

Other designations
- IK Tau, NML Tauri, 2MASS J03532886+1124216, IRAS 03507+1115, AAVSO 0347+11

Database references
SIMBAD	data

IK Tauri or NML Tauri is a Mira variable star located about 280 parsecs (910 ly) from the Sun in the zodiac constellation of Taurus.

== Discovery ==
In 1965, Neugebauer, Martz, and Leighton, astronomers with the California Institute of Technology, reported the discovery of two extremely cool stars. At the time, the temperatures of these extremely red objects were estimated to be around 1,000 K.

In the absence of other designations, these were named after the initials of their discoverers as NML Cygni and NML Tauri. It was identified as a Mira variable in 1967. The name NML Tauri fell into disuse after the star received its variable star designation of IK Tauri.

== Variability ==
IK Tauri varies approximately every 470 days between extreme visual magnitudes of 10.8 and 16.5. It was classified as a Mira variable soon after discovery on the basis of its spectrum showing strong hydrogen emission and its very large visual amplitude. During each cycle, the spectrum of the star also varies, consistently reaching M10 near minimum and only M6-M8 at maximum.

== Properties ==
IK Tauri pulsates strongly every 470 days, being coolest and largest at minimum brightness. The bolometric luminosity varies less dramatically and is estimated to be 8,724 L_{☉}. The temperature is calculated to be only 2,234 K, and the radius is calculated to be 608 R_{☉}.

IK Tauri has strong maser emission from its extended atmosphere and circumstellar material. The circumstellar material is rich in dust, with alumina close to the star and silicates further out. The two types of dust form separate shells, one within twice the star's radius and one more than three times its radius. The densest region of dust is at 6–8 times IK Tauri's radius.

Although IK Tauri is far below naked eye visibility, even at maximum brightness, this is due to the low temperature and strong extinction at visual wavelengths. In the infrared, it is brighter than prominent stars such as Rigel (K-band magnitude +0.18) and comparable to Sirius (K-band magnitude −1.35).

== Evolution ==
As a Mira variable, IK Tauri is an asymptotic giant branch (AGB) star, originally around 1.5 M_{☉}. It has exhausted its core hydrogen and helium, is not massive enough to ignite its carbon-oxygen core, and is now alternately fusing in concentric hydrogen and helium shells. As the inert core grows and the hydrogen shell nears the surface, mass loss becomes very high, and the star becomes highly obscured visually, an infrared star. It will then quickly lose its entire atmosphere, creating a planetary nebula and leaving behind a white dwarf.
