= Chandrasekhar–Eddington dispute =

History article about the disagreements between Arthur Eddington and S. Chandraskhar

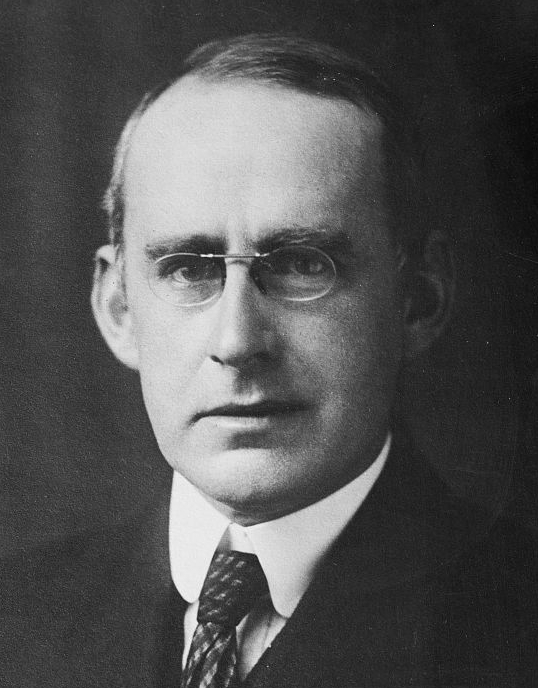
Arthur Eddington (1882–1944)

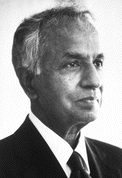
Subrahmanyan Chandrasekhar (1910–1995)

In the Chandrasekhar–Eddington dispute of the early 20th century, English astronomer Arthur Eddington and Indian astronomer Subrahmanyan Chandrasekhar disagreed over the correct theory to describe the final stages of a star's lifecycle. During the dispute, Chandrasekhar was at the beginning of his career and Eddington was a renowned physicist of the time. Chandrasekhar had proposed a limit, now known as the Chandrasekhar limit, to the mass of a white dwarf star. In a series of conferences and encounters Eddington advocated for an alternative theory, openly criticizing and mocking Chandrasekhar's models.

Chandrasekhar's theories ended up being successful in astronomy; he received the Nobel Prize in Physics in 1983 for his stellar models. Chandrasekhar's limit became a supporting piece of theoretical evidence for the existence of black holes.

== Background ==
Arthur Eddington was renowned for the 1919 Eddington experiment, in which he demonstrated Albert Einstein's general relativity by measuring the deviation of light by the sun during an eclipse on Príncipe island in Africa.

In the early 1920s, three candidate white dwarfs were known. These stars were proposed to have formed at the end of a star's life cycle when it collapsed under its own weight. The remaining material forms a star in a very dense state. One of the three white dwarfs, Sirius B, a companion to Sirius, was discovered by Walter Sydney Adams after a suggestion by Arthur Eddington to use the relativistic Doppler effect as predicted by special relativity. In 1926, Eddington pointed out a problem with the models at the time which considered such dense matter as the lowest energy state. Eddington suggested that it could not be the case as stars radiate and cool down. Ralph H. Fowler solved this issue by considering that the white dwarf is held from collapsing further due to electron degeneracy pressure.

In 1929, based on James Jeans' stellar models, Edmund Clifton Stoner, working in collaboration with Wilhelm Anderson, investigated the mass limits of white dwarfs, modelling them as homogeneous spherical stars governed by quantum Fermi–Dirac statistics.

Subrahmanyan Chandrasekhar had recently graduated from Presidency College, Madras, India, and was accepted for a scholarship at University of Cambridge. During his boat trip to England, without knowing of Stoner and Anderson's work, he theorized a more sophisticated stellar model based on Fowler's work, in which he also noticed that due to relativistic constraints a white dwarf could not surpass a certain mass. He published his model in 1930.

During Chandrasekhar's studies at Cambridge, Fowler, Eddington and Edward Arthur Milne, remained skeptical of his proposed limit because the theory did not explain what would happen if a star's mass exceeded the limit. However, Milne and Eddington, who became the examiners of Chandrasekhar's 1933 PhD thesis, appreciated Chandrasekhar's work on white dwarfs because it could help solve some discrepancies between the two. Chandrasekhar's model supported Eddington's idea that a star over the critical mass would act as a perfect gas, but according to Chandrasekhar, not all stars would become white dwarfs. This was in direct conflict with Eddington's theories. Soon after, the same year, Chandrasekhar was elected fellow of the Royal Astronomical Society.

After leaving Cambridge, Chandrasekhar resumed his work on the mass limit of stars in 1934, in Russia, working with Viktor Ambartsumian and Lev Landau.

== Disputes ==
Chandrasekhar was in close contact with Eddington, who was aware of his recent works. In preparation for a meeting of the Royal Astronomical Society in 1935, Chandrasekhar noticed that Eddington had booked a talk right after him but was unaware of its contents, and Eddington did not disclose it during their conversations. During the meeting, on 11 January, Chandrasekhar presented a full solution to his stellar equation. Eddington followed up with a presentation on similar topic, titled "Relativistic Degeneracy", in which he directly criticized Chandrasekhar's theory, saying it lacked physical meaning. Eddington's criticism focused on the upper limit for a white dwarf's mass, and he disapproved of Chandrasekhar's use of relativity along with non-relativistic quantum theory. Milne was supportive of Eddington's arguments. Chandrasekhar left the conference depressed.

Later the same year, during the general assembly of the International Astronomical Union in Paris, Eddington continued to promote his criticism of Chandrasekhar's theory. Chandrasekhar would later comment in an interview that Eddington made fun of his theory during the conference. Chandrasekhar appealed to Henry Norris Russell, the president of the assembly, but he convinced Chandrasekhar not to reply to Eddington's remarks. At the end of the meeting Eddington went to say "I am sorry if I hurt you" to Chandrasekhar.

Chandrasekhar decided to write about the controversy to Léon Rosenfeld, who was working with Niels Bohr. Bohr and Rosenfeld responded that they were "absolutely unable to see any meaning in Eddington's statements." Bohr, Rosenfeld and Wolfgang Pauli (by suggestion of the other two) received Chandrasekhar's paper but said that they were too busy to deal with the controversy, yet approved Chandrasekhar's methodology.

Chandrasekhar wrote a couple of papers in collaboration with Christian Møller, to refute and point out contradictions in Eddington's theory.

In 1936, Rudolf Peierls published a paper that proved a relation between pressure and volume of a relativistic gas that was against Eddington's theory. The same year, during a meeting at Harvard University, Eddington described Chandrasekhar's theory as "stellar buffoonery".

In 1937, Chandrasekhar met again with Eddington in England on his way to the International Astrophysical Colloquium in Paris. Eddington, Chandrasekhar, Paul Dirac and Maurice Pryce met. Their discussion ended when Eddington left after a dispute. Chandrasekhar recorded in his version of the event:

Pryce expressed surprise at seeing me and asked me whether I would join them in discussion with Eddington after Hall on the matter of relativistic degeneracy. After Hall, we adjourned to Pryce's room in Neville's Court. The discussion began with Pryce trying to tell Eddington his version of Eddington's arguments against relativistic degeneracy, so that Eddington could be satisfied that he, Pryce, understood Eddington's arguments. After Pryce had completed his narration, Eddington remarked that Pryce's account was entirely fair and accurate, and asked, "What was the argument about?" Pryce turned to Dirac and asked him, "Did you agree with any of the things I have said?" Dirac said, "No." Pryce added, "I do not either." Eddington became very angry - in fact, it was the only occasion when I saw him really angry. He got up from his chair, walked back and forth, and said, "This matter is not for joking!" He went on finding fault with Pryce's argument even though he had agreed with it a moment earlier and, for the next hour of so, it was Eddington's monologue. Next day, after Hall, Eddington came up to me and said that he was very disappointed that Dirac did not seem to understand the implications of his own relativity theory of the electron. I did not assent or dissent with Eddington's remark but asked instead, "How much of your fundamental theory depends on your ideas on relativistic degeneracy?" He replied, "Why, all of it!". Since I did not react to that remark, he asked me why I had asked the question. My response was, "I am only sorry" - not a polite remark to have made but by that time I was really enraged with Eddington's supreme confidence in himself and his own ideas.

In 1939, Chandrasekhar finished his theory of white dwarfs, which was quickly praised by Bengt Strömgren and Paul Ledoux. The latter said in his introductory book of astronomy that Chandrasekhar's theory deserved to be compared to the works of Eddington, Jeans and Svein Rosseland. In a conference in Paris in the same year, Chandrasekhar openly said for the first time that Eddington's theory was wrong.

In a paper in 1941, Peierls, Dirac, and Pryce pointed out Eddington's misunderstandings of the theory of relativity in conjunction with quantum theory.

== Aftermath ==
Eddington died in 1944 and never retracted his attacks on Chandrasekhar. Nevertheless, Chandrasekhar maintained correspondence with Eddington at the end of his life and held admiration for him. In an obituary speech for Eddington, Chandrasekhar says "that posterity may rank Eddington, next to Karl Schwarzschild, as the greatest astronomer of our time."

The discovery of Cygnus X-1 in 1972, the first detection of a black hole, demonstrated that a star beyond Chandrasekhar limit had collapsed into something other than a white dwarf.

In 1983, Chandrasekhar received the Nobel Prize in Physics, alongside William Alfred Fowler, for their "theoretical studies of the physical processes of importance to the structure and evolution of the stars." For the Nobel biography, Chandrasekhar listed Eddington as his friend.
