= Eddington number =

Number of protons in the observable universe

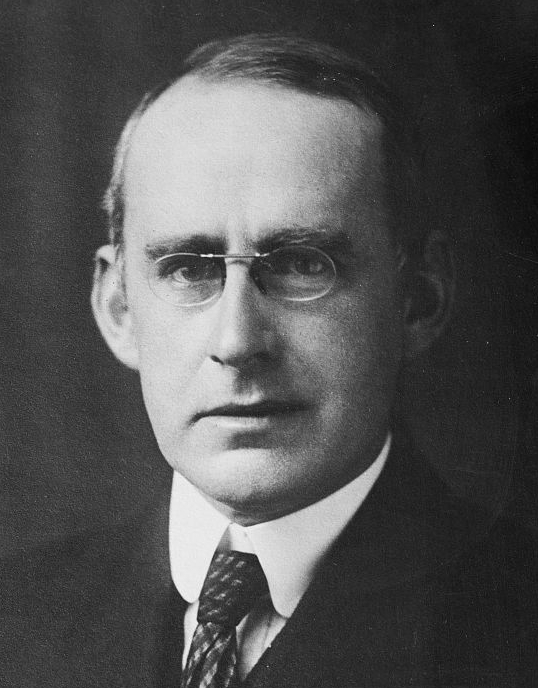
Arthur Stanley Eddington (1882–1944)

In astrophysics, the Eddington number, N_{Edd}, is the number of protons in the observable universe. Eddington originally calculated it as about 1.57×10^{79}; current estimates make it approximately 10^{80}.

The term is named for British astrophysicist Arthur Eddington, who in 1940 was the first to propose a value of N_{Edd} and to explain why this number might be important for physical cosmology and the foundations of physics.

== History ==
Eddington argued that the value of the fine-structure constant, α, could be obtained by pure deduction. He related α to the Eddington number, which was his estimate of the number of protons in the universe. This led him in 1929 to conjecture that α was exactly 1/136. He devised a "proof" that N_{Edd} = 136 × 2^{256}, or about 1.57×10^{79}. Other physicists did not adopt this conjecture and did not accept his argument. It even led to a major journal publishing a joke article making fun of the idea.

During a course of lectures that he delivered in 1938 as Tarner Lecturer at Trinity College, Cambridge, Eddington averred that:

I believe there are 15747724136275002577605653961181555468044717914527116709366231425076185631031296 protons in the universe and the same number of electrons.

This large number was soon named the "Eddington number".

Shortly thereafter, improved measurements of α yielded values closer to 1/137, whereupon Eddington changed his "proof" to show that α had to be exactly 1/137.

Current estimates of N_{Edd} point to a value of about 10^{80}. These estimates assume that all matter can be taken to be hydrogen and require assumed values for the number and size of galaxies and stars in the universe.

== See also ==
- Eddington–Dirac number
- The Sand Reckoner
- Universe

== Bibliography ==
- Barrow, John D. (2002). The Constants of Nature from Alpha to Omega: The Numbers That Encode the Deepest Secrets of the Universe. New York: Pantheon Books. ISBN 978-0-375-42221-8.
- Barrow, John D.; Tipler, Frank J. (1986). The anthropic cosmological principle. Oxford: Oxford University Press. ISBN 978-0-19-851949-2.
- Dingle, Herbert (1954). The Sources of Eddington's Philosophy. London: Cambridge University Press. OCLC 531389.
- Eddington, Arthur Stanley (1928). The Nature of the Physical World. London: Cambridge University Press. OCLC 645108.
- Eddington, Arthur Stanley (1935). New Pathways in Science. London: Cambridge University Press. OCLC 522390.
- Eddington, Arthur Stanley (1939). The Philosophy of Physical Science. London: Cambridge University Press. OCLC 669925.
- Eddington, Arthur Stanley (1946). Whittaker, E. T. (ed.). Fundamental Theory. Cambridge: Cambridge University Press. OCLC 2484474.
- Kilmister, C.W.; Tupper, B.O.J. (1962). Eddington's Statistical Theory. London: Oxford University Press. OCLC 1294788.
- Slater, Noel Bryan (1957). Development and Meaning in Eddington's Fundamental Theory. London: Cambridge University Press. OCLC 843162.
- Whittaker, E. T. (1951). Eddington's Principle in the Philosophy of Science. London: Cambridge University Press. OCLC 1453203.
- Whittaker, E. T. (1958). From Euclid to Eddington. New York: Dover. OCLC 8119156.
