= Noel Slater =

British mathematician and astronomer

Prof Noel Bryan Slater FRAS FRSE (29 July 1912 – 31 January 1973) was a 20th-century British mathematician and astronomer.

== Life ==
He was born on 29 July 1912 in Blackburn, Lancashire the son of Minnie Jane Bryan, and her husband, Doctor Albert Slater. His father was not a doctor but was christened with the name Doctor. He was generally known as D. Albert Slater. Slated was educated at Blackburn Grammar School. His parents then moved to Scotland where he was educated at North Berwick High School then Fordyce Academy in Banff.

He studied mathematics at the University of Edinburgh, graduating with an MA in 1929. He then won a scholarship to the University of Cambridge where he gained a further MA in astronomy. He continued his studies at the university as a postgraduate gaining a first doctorate (PhD) and second doctorate (DSc) in 1932. He was junior observer at Cambridge Solar Physics Observatory from 1939 to 1946 alongside C. G. Pendse and E. T. Pierce.

In the Second World War he served with the Projectile Development Establishment looking at rocket technology. After the war he joined the University of Leeds as a lecturer in applied mathematics rising to Reader by 1958.

In 1954 he was elected a Fellow of the Royal Society of Edinburgh. His proposers were Sir Edmund Taylor Whittaker, William Marshall Smart, Edward Thomas Copson, and Harold Stanley Ruse.

In 1961 he accepted a post as Professor of Applied Mathematics at the University of Hull.

He died in office in Hull on 31 January 1973.

== Family ==
He married Jessie Mycock.

== Publications ==
- The Development and Meaning of Eddington's Fundamental Theory (1957)
- Theory of Unimolecular Reactions (1960)
