= Arthur Eddington =

British astrophysicist (1882–1944)

Sir Arthur Eddington OM FRS FRAS
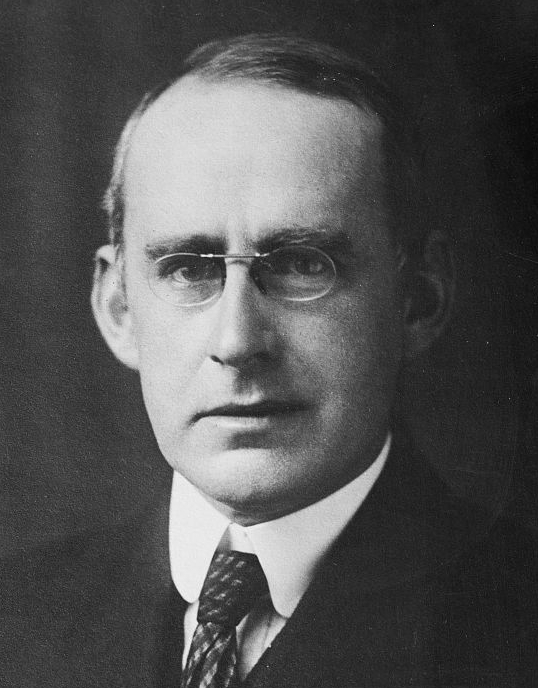
- Born: Arthur Stanley Eddington; 28 December 1882; Kendal, Westmorland, England
- Died: 22 November 1944 (aged 61); Cambridge, Cambridgeshire, England
- Education: University of Manchester; Trinity College, Cambridge
- Known for: Arrow of time Eddington approximation Eddington experiment Eddington's affine geometry Eddington limit Eddington number Eddington valve Eddington–Dirac number Eddington–Finkelstein coordinates Eddington stellar model Eddington–Sweet circulation
- Awards: Royal Society Royal Medal (1928); Smith's Prize (1907); RAS Gold Medal (1924); Henry Draper Medal (1924); Bruce Medal (1924); Knight Bachelor (1930); Order of Merit (1938)
- Scientific career
- Fields: Astrophysics
- Workplaces: Trinity College, Cambridge
- Academic advisors: E. T. Whittaker; Alfred North Whitehead; Ernest William Barnes; Robert Alfred Herman
- Doctoral students: Subrahmanyan Chandrasekhar; Leslie Comrie; Hermann Bondi
- Other notable students: Georges Lemaître; Vibert Douglas; George C. McVittie

Sir Arthur Stanley Eddington (28 December 1882 – 22 November 1944) was an English astrophysicist and mathematician. The Eddington limit, the natural limit to the luminosity of stars, or the radiation generated by accretion onto a compact object, is named in his honour.

Around 1920, he foreshadowed the discovery and mechanism of nuclear fusion processes in stars in his paper "The Internal Constitution of the Stars". At that time, the source of stellar energy was a complete mystery; Eddington was the first to correctly speculate that the source was fusion of hydrogen into helium.

Eddington wrote a number of articles that announced and explained Einstein's theory of general relativity to the English-speaking world. World War I had severed many lines of scientific communication, and new developments in German science were not well known in England. He also conducted an expedition to observe the solar eclipse of 29 May 1919 on the Island of Príncipe that provided one of the earliest confirmations of general relativity. As a populariser of science, he became known for his popular expositions and interpretations of Einstein's theory. As a philosopher of science, Eddington speculated on the implications of quantum mechanics on mind and matter.

== Early years ==
Eddington was born 28 December 1882 in Kendal, Westmorland (now Cumbria), England, the son of Quaker parents, Arthur Henry Eddington, headmaster of the Quaker School, and Sarah Ann Shout.

His father taught at a Quaker training college in Lancashire before moving to Kendal to become headmaster of Stramongate School. He died in the typhoid epidemic which swept England in 1884. His mother was left to bring up her two children with relatively little income. The family moved to Weston-super-Mare where at first Stanley (as his mother and sister always called Eddington) was educated at home before spending three years at a preparatory school. The family lived in a house called Varzin at 42 Walliscote Road. A commemorative plaque on the building explains Eddington's contributions to science.

In 1893 Eddington entered Brynmelyn School. He proved to be a most capable scholar, particularly in mathematics and English literature. His performance earned him a scholarship to Owens College, Manchester (now University of Manchester) in 1898. He spent the first year in a general course, but he turned to physics for the next three years. Eddington was greatly influenced by his physics and mathematics teachers, Arthur Schuster and Horace Lamb. At Manchester, Eddington lived at Dalton Hall, where he came under the lasting influence of the Quaker mathematician J. W. Graham. His progress was rapid, winning him several scholarships, and he graduated with a BSc in physics with First Class Honours in 1902.

Based on his performance at Owens College, he was awarded a scholarship to Trinity College, Cambridge, in 1902. His tutor at Cambridge was Robert Alfred Herman, and in 1904 Eddington became the first ever second-year student to be placed as Senior Wrangler. After receiving his M.A. in 1905, he began research on thermionic emission in the Cavendish Laboratory. This did not go well, and meanwhile he spent time teaching mathematics to first year engineering students. This hiatus was brief. Through a recommendation by E. T. Whittaker, his senior colleague at Trinity College, he secured a position at the Royal Observatory, Greenwich, where he was to embark on his career in astronomy, a career whose seeds had been sown even as a young child when he would often "try to count the stars".

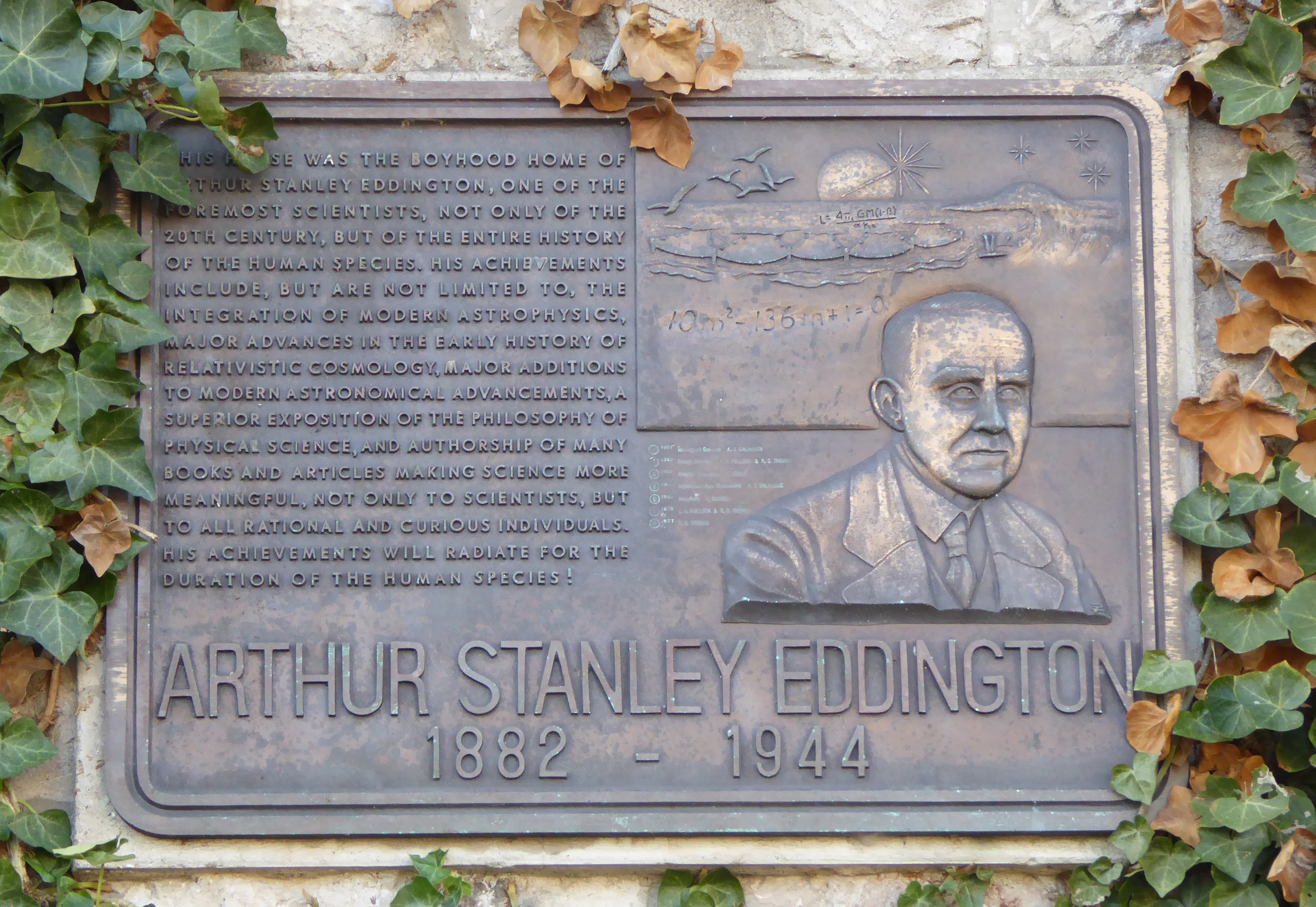
Plaque at 42 Walliscote Road, Weston-super-Mare

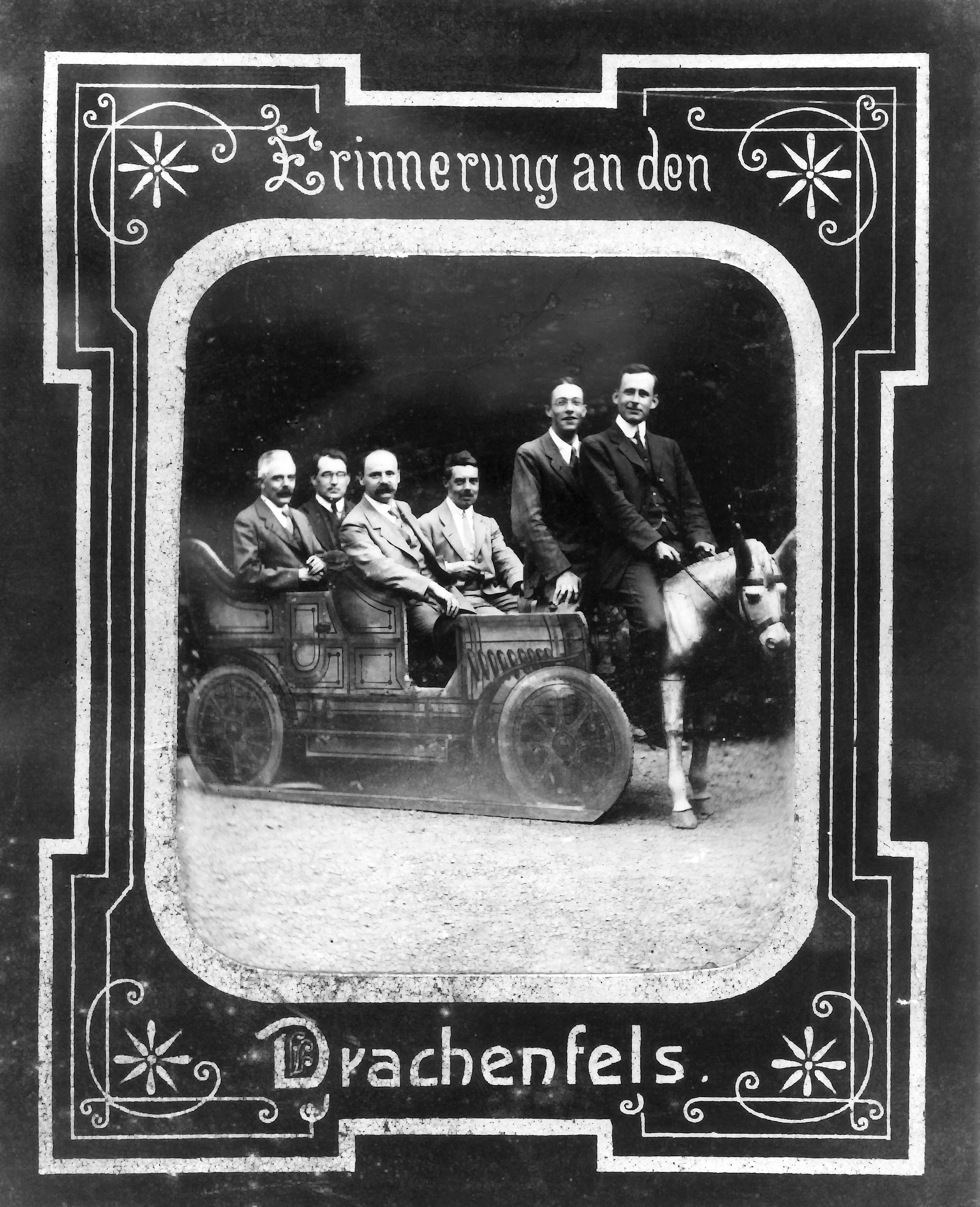
Eddington, right, on a toy donkey; possibly during the Fifth Conference of the International Union for Co-operation in Solar Research, held in Bonn, Germany, 1913

== Astronomy ==
In January 1906, Eddington was nominated to the post of chief assistant to the Astronomer Royal at the Royal Observatory. He left Cambridge for Greenwich the following month. He was put to work on a detailed analysis of the parallax of 433 Eros on photographic plates that had started in 1900. He developed a statistical method based on the apparent drift of two background stars, winning him the Smith's Prize in 1907. The prize won him a fellowship of Trinity College, Cambridge. In December 1912, George Darwin, son of Charles Darwin, died suddenly, and Eddington was promoted to his chair as the Plumian Professor of Astronomy and Experimental Philosophy in early 1913. Later that year, Robert Ball, holder of the theoretical Lowndean chair, also died, and Eddington was named the director of the Cambridge Observatory the next year. In May 1914, he was elected a fellow of the Royal Society: he was awarded the Royal Medal in 1928 and delivered the Bakerian Lecture in 1926.

Eddington also investigated the interior of stars through theory and developed the first true understanding of stellar processes. He began this in 1916 with investigations of possible physical explanations for Cepheid variable stars. He began by extending Karl Schwarzschild's earlier work on radiation pressure in Emden polytropic models. These models treated a star as a sphere of gas held up against gravity by internal thermal pressure, and one of Eddington's chief additions was to show that radiation pressure was necessary to prevent collapse of the sphere. He developed his model despite knowingly lacking firm foundations for understanding opacity and energy generation in the stellar interior. However, his results allowed for calculation of temperature, density and pressure at all points inside a star (thermodynamic anisotropy), and Eddington argued that his theory was so useful for further astrophysical investigation that it should be retained despite not being based on completely accepted physics. James Jeans contributed the important suggestion that stellar matter would certainly be ionized, but that was the end of any collaboration between the pair, who became famous for their lively debates.

Eddington defended his method by pointing to the utility of his results, particularly his important mass–luminosity relation. This had the unexpected result of showing that virtually all stars, including giants and dwarfs, behaved as ideal gases. In the process of developing his stellar models, he sought to overturn current thinking about the sources of stellar energy. Jeans and others defended the Kelvin–Helmholtz mechanism, which was based on classical mechanics, while Eddington speculated broadly about the qualitative and quantitative consequences of possible proton–electron annihilation and nuclear fusion processes.

Around 1920, he anticipated the discovery and mechanism of nuclear fusion processes in stars, in his paper "The Internal Constitution of the Stars". At that time, the source of stellar energy was a complete mystery; Eddington correctly speculated that the source was fusion of hydrogen into helium, liberating enormous energy according to Einstein's equation E = mc^{2}. This was a particularly remarkable development since at that time fusion and thermonuclear energy, and even the fact that stars are largely composed of hydrogen (see metallicity), had not yet been discovered. Eddington's paper, based on knowledge at the time, reasons:

1. The leading theory of stellar energy, the contraction hypothesis (cf. the Kelvin–Helmholtz mechanism), should cause stars' rotation to visibly speed up due to conservation of angular momentum. But observations of Cepheid variable stars showed this was not happening.
2. The only other known plausible source of energy was conversion of matter to energy; Einstein had shown some years earlier that a small amount of matter was equivalent to a large amount of energy.
3. Francis Aston had also recently shown that the mass of a helium atom was about 0.8% less than the mass of the four hydrogen atoms which would, combined, form a helium atom, suggesting that if such a combination could happen, it would release considerable energy as a byproduct.
4. If a star contained just 5% of fusible hydrogen, it would suffice to explain how stars got their energy. (We now know that most "ordinary" stars contain far more than 5% hydrogen.)
5. Further elements might also be fused, and other scientists had speculated that stars were the "crucible" in which light elements combined to create heavy elements, but without more-accurate measurements of their atomic masses nothing more could be said at the time.

All of these speculations were proven correct in the following decades.

With these assumptions, he demonstrated that the interior temperature of stars must be millions of degrees. In 1924, he discovered the mass–luminosity relation for stars (see Lecchini in § Further reading). Despite some disagreement, Eddington's models were eventually accepted as a powerful tool for further investigation, particularly in issues of stellar evolution. The confirmation of his estimated stellar diameters by Michelson in 1920 proved crucial in convincing astronomers unused to Eddington's intuitive, exploratory style. Eddington's theory appeared in mature form in 1926 as The Internal Constitution of the Stars, which became an important text for training a generation of astrophysicists.

Eddington's work in astrophysics in the late 1920s and the 1930s continued his work in stellar structure, and precipitated further clashes with Jeans and Edward Arthur Milne. An important topic was the extension of his models to take advantage of developments in quantum physics, including the use of degeneracy physics in describing dwarf stars.

The topic of extension of his models precipitated his dispute with Subrahmanyan Chandrasekhar, a student at Cambridge. Chandrasekhar's work presaged the discovery of black holes, which at the time seemed so absurdly non-physical that Eddington refused to believe that Chandrasekhar's purely mathematical derivation had consequences for the real world. Eddington was wrong, and his motivation is controversial. Chandrasekhar's narrative of this incident, in which his work is harshly rejected, portrays Eddington as rather cruel and dogmatic. However, Chandrasekhar did benefit from his association with Eddington. It was Eddington and Milne who put up Chandrasekhar's name for the fellowship for the Royal Society (FRS) which Chandrasekhar obtained. An FRS meant he was at the Cambridge high-table with all the luminaries and a very comfortable endowment for research. Eddington's criticism seems to have been based partly on a suspicion that a purely mathematical derivation from relativity theory was not enough to explain the seemingly daunting physical paradoxes that were inherent to degenerate stars, but to have "raised irrelevant objections" in addition, as Thanu Padmanabhan puts it.

== Theory of general relativity ==
Memorial of Arthur Eddington at Roça Sundy, on the island of Príncipe, São Tomé and Príncipe

During World War I, Eddington was secretary of the Royal Astronomical Society, which meant he was the first to receive a series of letters and papers from Willem de Sitter regarding Einstein's theory of general relativity. Eddington was one of the few English astronomers with the mathematical skills to understand general relativity, and because of his internationalist and pacifist views inspired by his Quaker religious beliefs, he was one of the few who was interested in pursuing a theory developed by a German physicist. He quickly became the chief supporter and expositor of relativity in Britain. He and Astronomer Royal Sir Frank Dyson organized two expeditions to observe a solar eclipse in 1919 to make the first empirical test of Einstein's theory: the measurement of the deflection of starlight by the Sun's gravitational field. In fact, Dyson's argument for the indispensability of Eddington's expertise in this test was what kept Eddington from being conscripted.

When conscription was introduced in Britain on 2 March 1916, Eddington intended to apply for an exemption as a conscientious objector. Cambridge University authorities instead requested and were granted an exemption on the ground of Eddington's work being of national interest. In 1918, this was appealed against by the Ministry of National Service. Before the appeal tribunal in June, Eddington claimed conscientious objector status, which was not recognized and would have ended his exemption in August 1918. Two additional hearings took place in June and July. Eddington's personal statement at the June hearing about his objection to war based on religious grounds is on record. Dyson supported Eddington at the July hearing with a written statement, emphasising Eddington's essential role in the solar eclipse expedition to Príncipe in May 1919. Eddington made clear his willingness to serve in the Friends' Ambulance Unit, under the jurisdiction of the British Red Cross, or as a harvest labourer. However, the tribunal's decision to grant a 12 month exemption from military service was on condition of Eddington continuing his astronomy work, in particular in preparation for the Príncipe expedition. The war ended before the end of his exemption.

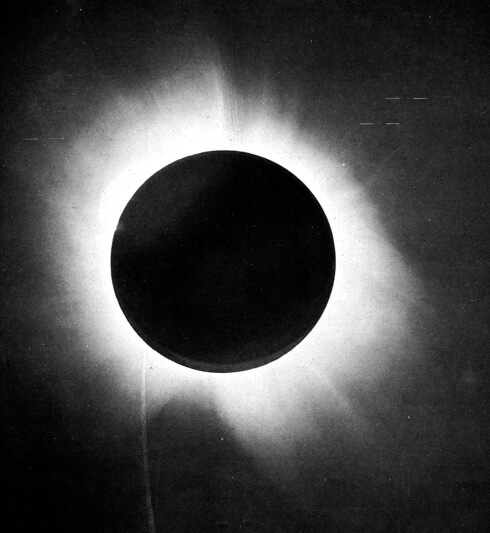
One of Eddington's photographs of the total solar eclipse of 29 May 1919, presented in his 1920 paper announcing its success, confirming Einstein's theory that light "bends"

After the war, Eddington travelled to Príncipe to watch the solar eclipse of 29 May 1919. During the eclipse, he took pictures of the stars (several stars in the Hyades cluster, including Kappa Tauri of the constellation Taurus) whose line of sight from the Earth happened to be near the Sun's location in the sky at that time of year. This effect is noticeable only during a total solar eclipse when the sky is dark enough to see stars which are normally obscured by the Sun's brightness. According to general relativity, starlight that grazed the Sun would appear to have been slightly shifted because it had been curved by its gravitational field. Eddington showed that Newtonian gravitation could be interpreted to predict half the shift predicted by Einstein.

Eddington's observations published the next year allegedly confirmed Einstein's theory and were hailed at the time as evidence of general relativity over the Newtonian model. The news was reported in newspapers all over the world as a major story. Afterward, Eddington embarked on a campaign to popularize relativity and the expedition as landmarks both in scientific development and international scientific relations.

It has been claimed that Eddington's observations were of poor quality, and he had unjustly discounted simultaneous observations at Sobral, Brazil, which appeared closer to the Newtonian model, but a 1979 re-analysis with modern measuring equipment and contemporary software validated Eddington's results and conclusions. The quality of the 1919 results was indeed poor compared to later observations but was sufficient to persuade contemporary astronomers. The results from the expedition to Brazil were rejected because of a defect in the telescopes used which, again, was completely accepted and well understood by contemporary astronomers.

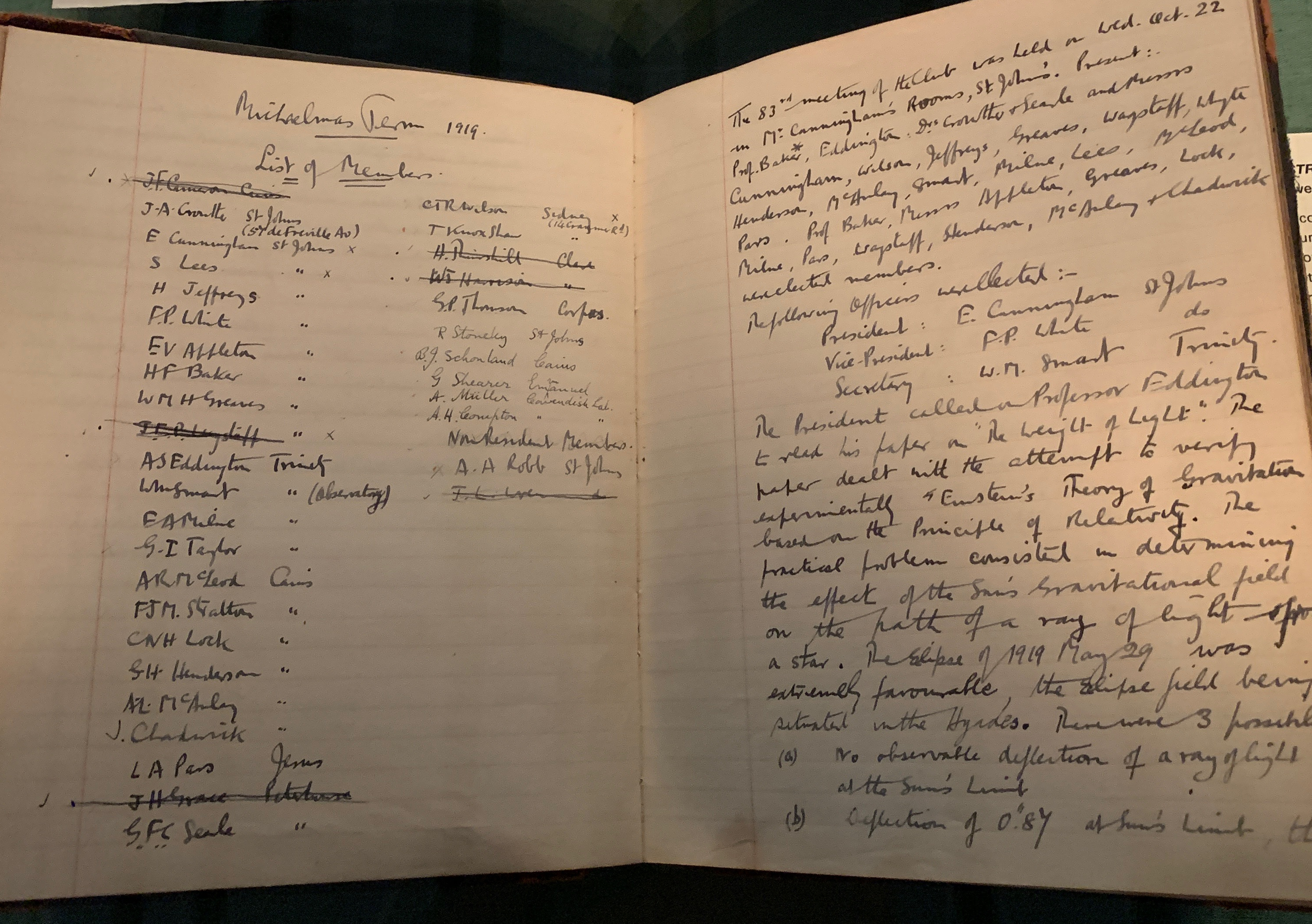
The minute book of Cambridge ∇^{2}V Club for the meeting where Eddington presented his observations of the curvature of light around the Sun, confirming Einstein's theory of general relativity. They include the line "A general discussion followed. The President remarked that the 83rd meeting was historic".

Throughout this period, Eddington lectured on relativity and was well known for his ability to explain the concepts in lay terms as well as scientific. He collected these lectures into the Mathematical Theory of Relativity in 1923, which Einstein called "the finest presentation of the subject in any language." Ludwik Silberstein, a physicist who thought of himself as an expert on relativity, approached Eddington at the Royal Society's 6 November 1919 meeting where he had defended Einstein's relativity with his Brazil-Príncipe solar eclipse calculations and ruefully charged Eddington as being of three men who actually understood the theory. When Eddington refrained from replying, Silberstein insisted he not be "so shy". Eddington replied, "Oh, no! I was wondering who the third one might be!"

== Cosmology ==
Eddington was heavily involved with the development of the first generation of general relativistic cosmological models. He had been investigating the instability of the Einstein universe when he learned of both Georges Lemaître's 1927 paper postulating an expanding or contracting universe and Edwin Hubble's work on the recession of the spiral nebulae. Eddington felt the cosmological constant must have played the crucial role in the universe's evolution from an Einsteinian steady state to its current expanding state, and most of his cosmological investigations focused on the constant's significance and characteristics. In The Mathematical Theory of Relativity, Eddington interprets the cosmological constant to mean that the universe is "self-gauging".

== Fundamental theory and the Eddington number ==
During the 1920s until his death, Eddington increasingly concentrated on what he called "fundamental theory" which was intended to be a unification of quantum theory, relativity, cosmology, and gravitation. At first he progressed along "traditional" lines, but turned increasingly to an almost numerological analysis of the dimensionless ratios of fundamental constants.

His basic approach was to combine several fundamental constants in order to produce a dimensionless number. In many cases these would result in numbers close to 10^{40}, its square, or its square root. He was convinced that the mass of the proton and the charge of the electron were a "natural and complete specification for constructing a Universe" and that their values were not accidental. One of the discoverers of quantum mechanics, Paul Dirac, also pursued this line of investigation, which has become known as the Dirac large numbers hypothesis.

A somewhat damaging statement in his defence of these concepts involved the fine-structure constant, α. At the time it was measured to be very close to 1/136, and Eddington argued that the value should in fact be exactly 1/136 for epistemological reasons. Later measurements placed the value much closer to 1/137, at which point he switched his line of reasoning to argue that one more should be added to the degrees of freedom, so that the value should in fact be exactly 1/137, the Eddington number. Some critics at the time started calling him "Arthur Adding-one". This change of stance detracted from Eddington's credibility in the physics community. As of 2022 the CODATA value is stated to be 1/137.035999177(21).

Eddington believed he had identified an algebraic basis for fundamental physics, which he termed "E-numbers" (representing a certain group – a Clifford algebra). These in effect incorporated spacetime into a higher-dimensional structure. While his theory has long been neglected by the general physics community, similar algebraic notions underlie many modern attempts at a Grand Unified Theory. Moreover, Eddington's emphasis on the values of the fundamental constants, and specifically upon dimensionless numbers derived from them, is nowadays a central concern of physics. In particular, he predicted a number of hydrogen atoms in the Universe 136 × 2^{256} ≈ 1.57×10^{79}, or equivalently the half of the total number of particles protons + electrons. He did not complete this line of research before his death in 1944; his book Fundamental Theory was published posthumously in 1948.

=== Eddington number for cycling ===
Eddington is credited with devising a measure of a cyclist's long-distance riding achievements. The Eddington number in the context of cycling is defined as the maximum number E such that the cyclist has cycled at least E miles on at least E days. For example, an Eddington number of 70 would imply that the cyclist has cycled at least 70 miles in a day on at least 70 occasions. Achieving a high Eddington number is difficult, since moving from, say, 70 to 75 will (probably) require more than five new long-distance rides, since any rides shorter than 75 miles will no longer be included in the reckoning. Eddington's own life-time E-number was 84. The Eddington number for cycling is analogous to the h-index that quantifies both the actual scientific productivity and the apparent scientific impact of a scientist.

== Philosophy ==
=== Idealism ===
Eddington wrote in his book The Nature of the Physical World that "The stuff of the world is mind-stuff."

The mind-stuff of the world is, of course, something more general than our individual conscious minds ... The mind-stuff is not spread in space and time; these are part of the cyclic scheme ultimately derived out of it ... It is necessary to keep reminding ourselves that all knowledge of our environment from which the world of physics is constructed, has entered in the form of messages transmitted along the nerves to the seat of consciousness ... Consciousness is not sharply defined, but fades into subconsciousness; and beyond that we must postulate something indefinite but yet continuous with our mental nature ... It is difficult for the matter-of-fact physicist to accept the view that the substratum of everything is of mental character. But no one can deny that mind is the first and most direct thing in our experience, and all else is remote inference.

— Eddington, The Nature of the Physical World, 276–81.

The idealist conclusion was not integral to his epistemology but was based on two main arguments. The first derives directly from current physical theory. Briefly, mechanical theories of the ether and of the behaviour of fundamental particles have been discarded in both relativity and quantum physics. From this, Eddington inferred that a materialistic metaphysics was outmoded and that, in consequence, since the disjunction of materialism or idealism are assumed to be exhaustive, an idealistic metaphysics is required.

The second and more interesting argument was based on Eddington's epistemology and may be regarded as consisting of two parts. First, all we know of the objective world is its structure, and the structure of the objective world is precisely mirrored in our own consciousness. We therefore have no reason to doubt that the objective world too is "mind-stuff". Dualistic metaphysics, then, cannot be evidentially supported. But second, not only can we not know that the objective world is nonmentalistic, we also cannot intelligibly suppose that it could be material. To conceive of a dualism entails attributing material properties to the objective world. However, this presupposes that we could observe that the objective world has material properties. But this is absurd, for whatever is observed must ultimately be the content of our own consciousness, and consequently, nonmaterial.

Eddington believed that physics cannot explain consciousness: "light waves are propagated from the table to the eye; chemical changes occur in the retina; propagation of some kind occurs in the optic nerves; atomic changes follow in the brain. Just where the final leap into consciousness occurs is not clear. We do not know the last stage of the message in the physical world before it became a sensation in consciousness".

Ian Barbour in his book Issues in Science and Religion (1966) cites Eddington's The Nature of the Physical World (1928) for a text that argues the uncertainty principle provides a scientific basis for "the defense of the idea of human freedom" and his Science and the Unseen World (1929) for support of philosophical idealism, "the thesis that reality is basically mental". Charles De Koninck points out that Eddington believed in objective reality existing apart from our minds but was using the phrase "mind-stuff" to highlight the inherent intelligibility of the world: that our minds and the physical world are made of the same "stuff" and that our minds are the inescapable connection to the world. As De Koninck quotes Eddington,

There is a doctrine well known to philosophers that the moon ceases to exist when no one is looking at it. I will not discuss the doctrine since I have not the least idea what is the meaning of the word existence when used in this connection. At any rate the science of astronomy has not been based on this spasmodic kind of moon. In the scientific world (which has to fulfill functions less vague than merely existing) there is a moon which appeared on the scene before the astronomer; it reflects sunlight when no one sees it; it has mass when no one is measuring the mass; it is distant 240,000 miles from the earth when no one is surveying the distance; and it will eclipse the sun in 1999 even if the human race has succeeded in killing itself off before that date.

— Eddington, The Nature of the Physical World, 226

=== Science ===
Against Einstein and others who advocated determinism, indeterminism—championed by Eddington—says that a physical object has an ontologically undetermined component that is not due to the epistemological limitations of physicists' understanding. The uncertainty principle, then, would not necessarily be due to hidden variables but to an indeterminism in nature itself. Eddington proclaims "It is a consequence of the advent of the quantum theory that physics is no longer pledged to a scheme of deterministic law". Eddington agrees with the tenet of logical positivism that "the meaning of a scientific statement is to be ascertained by reference to the steps which would be taken to verify it".

== Popular and philosophical writings ==
Eddington wrote a parody of The Rubaiyat of Omar Khayyam, recounting his 1919 solar eclipse experiment. It contains the following quatrain:

Oh leave the Wise our measures to collate
One thing at least is certain, LIGHT has WEIGHT,
One thing is certain, and the rest debate—
Light-rays, when near the Sun, DO NOT GO STRAIGHT.

In addition to his textbook The Mathematical Theory of Relativity, during the 1920s and 30s, Eddington gave numerous lectures, interviews, and radio broadcasts on relativity and quantum mechanics. Many of these were gathered into books, including The Nature of the Physical World and New Pathways in Science. His use of literary allusions and humour help make these difficult subjects more accessible. One familiar image drawn by Eddington consists of his "two tables", which represent a paradox concerned with what really exists: one table is the familiar and commonplace one, with properties of extension, colour, and permanence, it is "substantial" in the sense that it is constituted of "substance"; the other is his 'scientific' one, nothing but myriad minute particles in empty space: the table which "modern physics has by delicate test and remorseless logic assured me . . . is the only one which is really there ... wherever 'there' may be." He began the lectures where he discusses this paradox in 1927 with an allusion to these two tables:

I have settled down to the task of writing these lectures and have drawn up my chairs to my two tables. Two tables! Yes; there are duplicates of every object about me - two tables, two chairs, two pens.

The second table is mostly emptiness, with numerous electric charges moving around at great speed, and this table is not "substantial" in any way. Eddington portrays the two tables as a recent innovation: physicists "used to borrow the raw material of [their] world from the familiar world", but for the new concepts, such as the electron, quantum or potential, there is no "familiar counterpart to these things" in "the world of commonplace experience".

Eddington's books and lectures were immensely popular with the public because of his clear exposition and for his willingness to discuss the philosophical and religious implications of physics. He argued for a deeply rooted philosophical harmony between scientific investigation and religious mysticism, and also that the positivist nature of relativity and quantum physics provided new room for personal religious experience and free will. Unlike many other spiritual scientists, he rejected the idea that science could provide proof of religious propositions. His popular writings made him a household name in Great Britain between the world wars.

== Death and legacy ==
Eddington died of cancer in the Evelyn Nursing Home, Cambridge, on 22 November 1944. He was unmarried. His body was cremated at Cambridge Crematorium (Cambridgeshire) on 27 November; his remains were buried in the grave of his mother in the Ascension Parish Burial Ground in Cambridge.

Cambridge University's North West Cambridge development has been named Eddington in his honour. Eddington is played by David Tennant in the television film Einstein and Eddington, with Einstein played by Andy Serkis. The film was notable for its groundbreaking portrayal of Eddington as a somewhat repressed gay man. It was first broadcast in 2008.

Actor Paul Eddington was a relative, mentioning in his autobiography (in light of his own weakness in mathematics) "what I then felt to be the misfortune" of being related to "one of the foremost physicists in the world". Paul's father Albert and Sir Arthur were second cousins, both great-grandsons of William Eddington (1755–1806).

=== Honours ===
==== Awards and honors ====
- Smith's Prize (1907)
- International Honorary Member of the American Academy of Arts and Sciences (1922)
- Bruce Medal of Astronomical Society of the Pacific (1924)
- Henry Draper Medal of the National Academy of Sciences (1924)
- Gold Medal of the Royal Astronomical Society (1924)
- International Member of the United States National Academy of Sciences (1925)
- Foreign membership of the Royal Netherlands Academy of Arts and Sciences (1926)
- Prix Jules Janssen of the Société astronomique de France (French Astronomical Society) (1928)
- Royal Medal of the Royal Society (1928)
- Knighthood (1930)
- International Member of the American Philosophical Society (1931)
- Order of Merit (1938)
- Honorary member of the Norwegian Astronomical Society (1939)
- Hon. Freeman of Kendal, 1930

==== Named after him ====
- Lunar crater Eddington
- asteroid 2761 Eddington
- Royal Astronomical Society's Eddington Medal
- Eddington mission, now cancelled
- Eddington Tower, halls of residence at the University of Essex
- Eddington Astronomical Society, an amateur society based in his hometown of Kendal
- Eddington, a house (group of students, used for in-school sports matches) of Kirkbie Kendal School
- Eddington, a new suburb of North West Cambridge, opened in 2017
- Eddington Community Interest Company (CIC), 2003. A Community Centre focusing on Climate Information and projects, including a Waste Food Community Café and Larder, in partnership with SLACC (South Lakes Action on Climate Change), converting the former United Reform Church in Kendal

==== Service ====
- Gave the Swarthmore Lecture in 1929
- Chairman of the National Peace Council 1941–1943
- President of the International Astronomical Union; of the Physical Society, 1930–32; of the Royal Astronomical Society, 1921–23
- Romanes Lecturer, 1922
- Gifford Lecturer, 1927

==== In popular culture ====
- Eddington is a central figure in the short story "The Mathematician's Nightmare: The Vision of Professor Squarepunt" by Bertrand Russell, a work featured in The Mathematical Magpie (1962) by Clifton Fadiman.
- Time placed him on the cover on 16 April 1934.
- The song "In Transit", from the 2023 album Signs Of Life by Neil Gaiman and Fourplay String Quartet was written in memory of him.

== Publications ==
- 1914. Stellar Movements and the Structure of the Universe. London: Macmillan: File:Eddington - Stellar Movements and the Structure of the Universe, 1914.pdf
- 1918. Report on the relativity theory of gravitation. London, Fleetway Press, Ltd.
- 1920. Space, Time and Gravitation: An Outline of the General Relativity Theory. Cambridge University Press. ISBN 0-521-33709-7
- 1922. The Theory of Relativity and its Influence on Scientific Thought
- 1923. 1952. The Mathematical Theory of Relativity. Cambridge University Press.
- 1925. The Domain of Physical Science. 2005 reprint: ISBN 1-4253-5842-X
- 1926. Stars and Atoms. Oxford: British Association.
- 1926. The Internal Constitution of Stars. Cambridge University Press. ISBN 0-521-33708-9
- 1928. The Nature of the Physical World. MacMillan. 1935 replica edition: ISBN 0-8414-3885-4, University of Michigan 1981 edition: ISBN 0-472-06015-5 (1926–27 Gifford lectures)
- 1929. Science and the Unseen World. US Macmillan, UK Allen & Unwin. 1980 Reprint Arden Library ISBN 0-8495-1426-6. 2004 US reprint – Whitefish, Montana : Kessinger Publications: ISBN 1-4179-1728-8. 2007 UK reprint London, Allen & Unwin ISBN 978-0-901689-81-8 (Swarthmore Lecture), with a new foreword by George Ellis.
- 1930. Why I Believe in God: Science and Religion, as a Scientist Sees It. Arrow/scrollable preview.
- 1933. The Expanding Universe: Astronomy's 'Great Debate', 1900–1931. Cambridge University Press. ISBN 0-521-34976-1
- 1935. New Pathways in Science. Cambridge University Press.
- 1936. Relativity Theory of Protons and Electrons. Cambridge Univ. Press.
- 1939. Philosophy of Physical Science. Cambridge University Press. ISBN 0-7581-2054-0 (1938 Tarner lectures at Cambridge)
- 1946. Fundamental Theory. Cambridge University Press.

== See also ==
=== Astronomy ===
- Chandrasekhar limit
- Eddington luminosity (also called the Eddington limit)
- Gravitational lens
- Outline of astronomy
- Stellar nucleosynthesis
- Timeline of stellar astronomy
- List of astronomers

=== Science ===
- Arrow of time
- Classical unified field theories
- Degenerate matter
- Dimensionless physical constant
- Dirac large numbers hypothesis (also called the Eddington–Dirac number)
- Introduction to quantum mechanics
- Luminiferous aether
- Parameterized post-Newtonian formalism
- Special relativity
- Theory of everything (also called "final theory" or "ultimate theory")
- Timeline of gravitational physics and relativity
- List of experiments

=== People ===
- List of science and religion scholars

=== Other ===
- Infinite monkey theorem
- Ontic structural realism
