= Eddington experiment =

1919 observations which confirmed Einstein's theory of general relativity

The 29 May 1919 solar eclipse

The Eddington experiment was an observational test of general relativity, organised by the British astronomers Frank Watson Dyson and Arthur Stanley Eddington in 1919. Observations of the total solar eclipse of 29 May 1919 were carried out by two expeditions, one to the West African island of Príncipe, and the other to the Brazilian town of Sobral. The aim of the expeditions was to measure the gravitational deflection of starlight passing near the Sun. The amount of deflection was predicted by Albert Einstein in a 1911 paper; however, his initial prediction proved inaccurate because it was based on an incomplete theory of general relativity. Einstein improved his prediction after finalizing his theory in 1915 and obtaining the solution to his equations by Karl Schwarzschild. Following the return of the expeditions, the results were presented by Eddington to a joint meeting of the Royal Society and Royal Astronomical Society in London and, after some deliberation, were accepted. Widespread newspaper coverage of the results led to worldwide fame for Einstein and his theories.

== Background ==
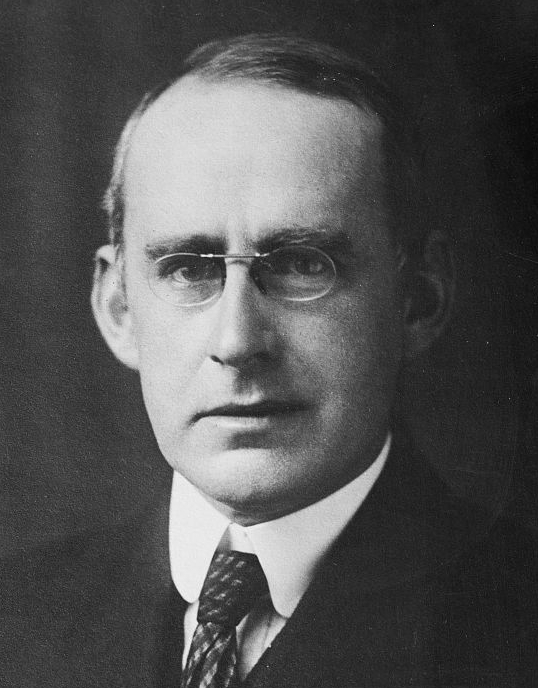
Arthur Stanley Eddington, Plumian Professor of Astronomy

One of the first considerations of gravitational deflection of light was published in 1801, when Johann Georg von Soldner pointed out that Newtonian gravity predicts that starlight will be deflected when it passes near a massive object. Initially, in a paper published in 1911, Einstein had incorrectly calculated that the amount of light deflection was the same as the Newtonian value, that is 0.83 seconds of arc for a star that would be just on the limb of the Sun in the absence of gravity.

In October 1911, responding to Einstein's encouragement, German astronomer Erwin Freundlich contacted solar eclipse expert Charles D. Perrine in Berlin to inquire as to the suitability of existing solar eclipse photographs to prove Einstein's prediction of light deflection. Perrine, the director of the Argentine National Observatory at Cordoba, had participated in four solar eclipse expeditions while at the Lick Observatory in 1900, 1901, 1905, and 1908. He did not believe existing eclipse photos would be useful. In 1912 Freundlich asked if Perrine would include observation of light deflection as part of the Argentine Observatory's program for the solar eclipse of 10 October 1912 in Brazil. W. W. Campbell, director of the Lick Observatory, loaned Perrine its intramercurial camera lenses. Perrine and the Cordoba team were the only eclipse expedition to construct specialized equipment dedicated to observe light deflection. Unfortunately all the expeditions suffered from torrential rains which prevented any observations. Nevertheless, Perrine was the first astronomer to make a dedicated attempt to observe light deflection to test Einstein's prediction. Eddington had taken part in a British expedition to Brazil to observe the 1912 eclipse but was interested in different measurements. Eddington and Perrine spent several days together in Brazil and may have discussed their observation programs including Einstein's prediction of light deflection.

In 1914 three eclipse expeditions, from Argentina, Germany, and the US, were committed to testing Einstein's theory by observing for light deflection. The three directors were Erwin Finlay-Freundlich, from the Berlin Observatory, the US astronomer William Wallace Campbell, director of the Lick Observatory, and Charles D. Perrine, director of the Argentine National Observatory at Cordoba. The three expeditions travelled to the Crimea in the Russian Empire to observe the eclipse of 21 August. However, the First World War started in July of that year, and Germany declared war on Russia on 1 August. The German astronomers were either forced to return home or were taken prisoner by the Russians. Although the US and Argentine astronomers were not detained, clouds prevented clear observations being made during the eclipse. Perrine's photographs, although not clear enough to prove Einstein's prediction, were the first obtained in an attempt to test Einstein's prediction of light deflection.

A second attempt by American astronomers to measure the effect during the 1918 eclipse was foiled by clouds in one location and by ambiguous results due to the lack of the correct equipment in another.

Einstein's 1911 paper predicted deflection of star light on the limb of the Sun to be 0.83 seconds of arc and encouraged astronomers to test this prediction by observing stars near the Sun during a solar eclipse. It is fortunate for Einstein that the weather precluded results by Perrine in 1912 and Perrine, Freundlich, and Campbell in 1914. If results had been obtained they may have disproved the 1911 prediction setting back Einstein's reputation. In any case, Einstein corrected his prediction in his 1915 paper on General Relativity to 1.75 seconds of arc for a star on the limb. Einstein and subsequent astronomers both benefitted from this correction.

Eddington's interest in general relativity began in 1916, during World War I, when he read papers by Einstein (presented in Berlin, Germany, in 1915), which had been sent by the neutral Dutch physicist Willem de Sitter to the Royal Astronomical Society in Britain. Eddington, later said to be one of the few people at the time to understand the theory, realised its significance and lectured on relativity at a meeting at the British Association in 1916. He emphasised the importance of testing the theory by methods such as eclipse observations of light deflection, and the Astronomer Royal, Frank Watson Dyson, began to make plans for the eclipse of May 1919, which would be particularly suitable for such a test. Eddington also produced a major report on general relativity for the Physical Society, published as Report on the Relativity Theory of Gravitation (1918). Eddington also lectured on relativity at Cambridge University, where he had been professor of astronomy since 1913. (Note: Following the eclipse expedition in 1919, Eddington published Space Time and Gravitation (1920), and his university lectures would form the basis for his magnum opus on the subject, Mathematical Theory of Relativity (1923), said by Einstein to be "... the finest presentation of the subject in any language".)

Wartime conscription in Britain was introduced in 1917. At the age of 34, Eddington was eligible to be drafted into the military, but his exemption from this was obtained by his university on the grounds of national interest. This exemption was later appealed by the War Ministry, and at a series of hearings in June and July 1918, Eddington, who was a Quaker, stated that he was a conscientious objector, based on religious grounds. At the final hearing, the Astronomer Royal, Frank Watson Dyson, supported the exemption by proposing that Eddington undertake an expedition to observe the total eclipse in May the following year to test Einstein's General Theory of Relativity. The appeal board granted a twelve-month extension for Eddington to do so. Although this extension was rendered moot by the signing of the Armistice in November, ending the war, the expedition went ahead as planned.

== Theory ==
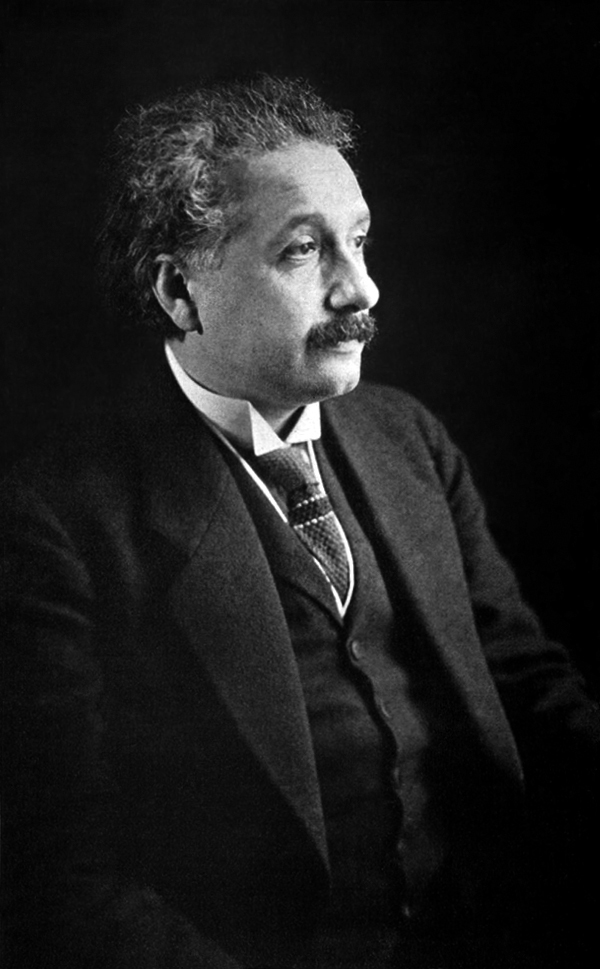
Einstein, recipient of the Nobel Prize in Physics in 1921, though not for his development of general relativity

The theory behind the experiment concerns the predicted deflection of light by the Sun. The first observation of light deflection was performed by noting the change in position of stars as they passed near the Sun on the celestial sphere. The approximate angular deflection δφ for a massless particle coming in from infinity and going back out to infinity is given by the following formula: (Note: For the derivation of this formula, see the article on the Two-body problem in general relativity.)

$$\delta \varphi \approx \frac{2r_{s}}{b} = \frac{4GM}{c^{2}b}.$$

Here, b can be interpreted as the distance of closest approach. Although this formula is approximate, it is accurate for most measurements of gravitational lensing, due to the smallness of the ratio r_{s}/b. For light grazing the surface of the Sun, the approximate angular deflection is roughly 1.75 arcseconds. This is twice the value predicted by calculations using the Newtonian theory of gravity. It was this difference in the deflection between the two theories that Eddington's expedition and other later eclipse observers would attempt to observe.

== Expeditions and observations ==
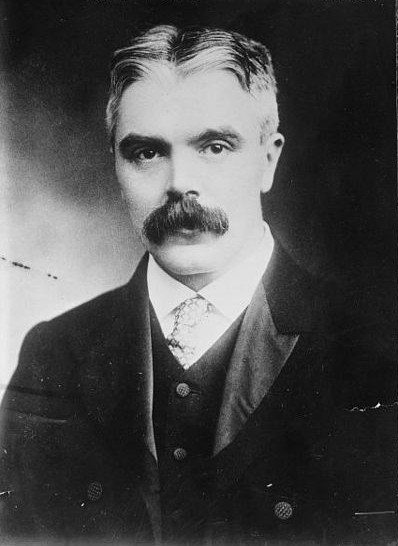
Sir Frank Watson Dyson, Astronomer Royal

The aim of the expeditions was to take advantage of the shielding effect of the Moon during a total solar eclipse, and to use astrometry to measure the positions of the stars in the sky around the Sun during the eclipse. These stars, not normally visible in the daytime due to the brightness of the Sun, would become visible during the moment of totality when the Moon covered the solar disc. A difference in the observed position of the stars during the eclipse, compared to their normal position (measured some months earlier at night, when the Sun is not in the field of view), would indicate that the light from these stars had bent as it passed close to the Sun. Dyson, when planning the expedition in 1916, had chosen the 1919 eclipse because it would take place with the Sun in front of a bright group of stars called the Hyades. The brightness of these stars would make it easier to measure any changes in position.

Two teams of two people were to be sent to make observations of the eclipse at two locations: the West African island of Príncipe and the Brazilian town of Sobral.

The Príncipe expedition members were Eddington and Edwin Turner Cottingham, from the Cambridge Observatory, while the Sobral expedition members were Andrew Crommelin and Charles Rundle Davidson, from the Greenwich Observatory in London. Eddington was Director of the Cambridge Observatory, and Cottingham was a clockmaker who worked on the observatory's instruments. Similarly, Crommelin was an assistant at the Greenwich Observatory, while Davidson was one of the observatory's computers.

The expeditions were organised by the Joint Permanent Eclipse Committee, a joint committee between the Royal Society and the Royal Astronomical Society, chaired by Dyson, the Astronomer Royal. The funding application for the expedition was made to the Government Grant Committee, asking for £100 for instruments and £1000 for travel and other costs.

=== Sobral ===
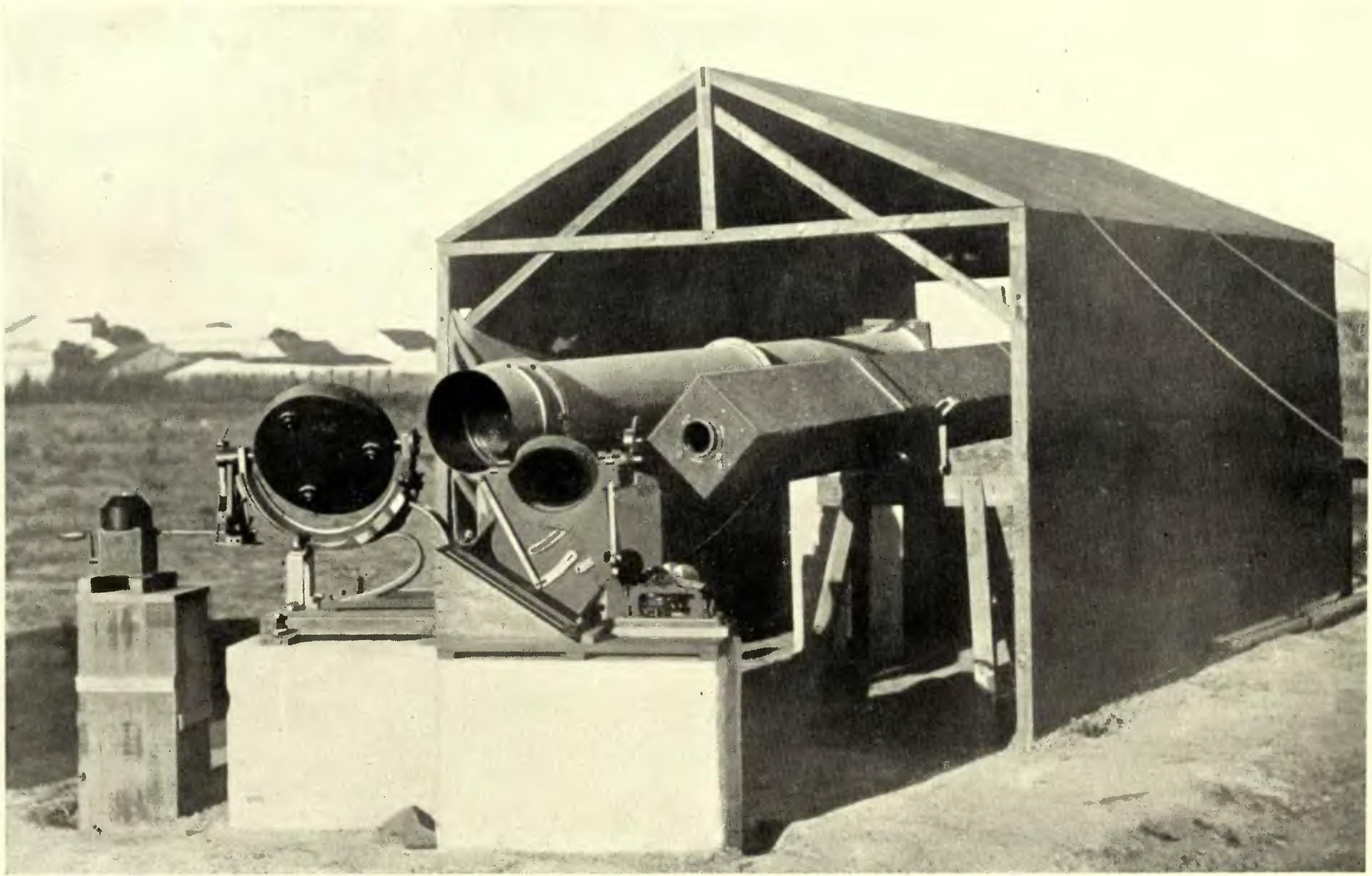
Eclipse instruments at Sobral

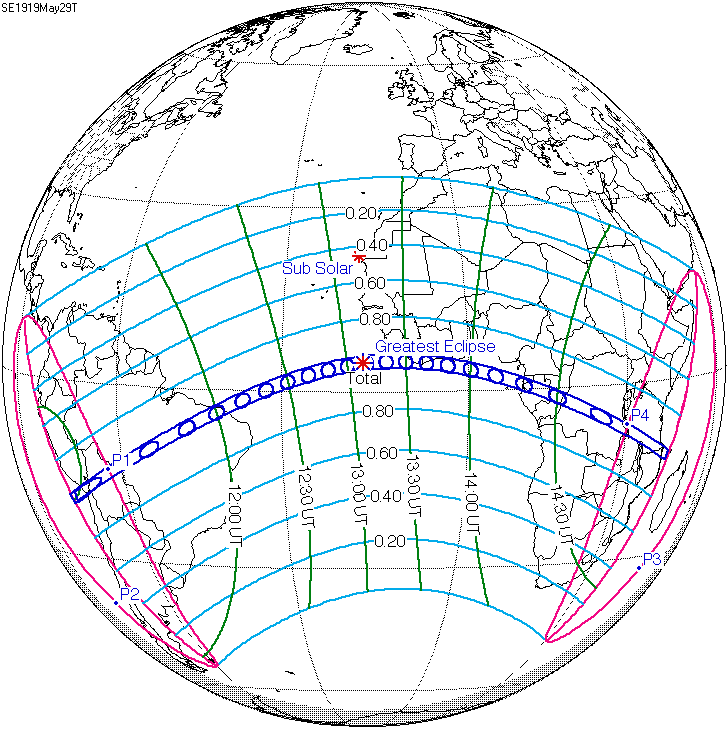
Map of the path of totality for the eclipse

In mid-1918, researchers from the Brazilian National Observatory, determined that the city of Sobral, Ceará, was the best geographical position to observe the Solar Eclipse. Its director, Henrique Charles Morize, sent a report to worldwide scientific institutions on the subject, including the Royal Astronomical Society, London.

The Greenwich Observatory team sent to Brazil consisted of Charles Davidson and Andrew Crommelin, with Frank Dyson coordinating everything from Europe and, later, being responsible for analyzing the team's data. The team arrived in Brazil on March 23, 1919, and its gear was waived without inspection as a courtesy from the Brazilian government. While Eddington took part in the Príncipe expedition, it is unknown why Dyson did not travel to Brazil.

The gear was made by two astrographic telescopes coupled to mirror systems known as coelostats; a main telescope from the Royal Greenwich Observatory with a 13-inch aperture and mounted to a 16-inch coelostat and a small backup telescope with a 4-inch aperture borrowed from Aloysius Cortie.

On April 30 the team arrived at Sobral. The eclipse day started cloudy, but the sky cleared and the Moon's disk began to obscure the Sun shortly before 8:56 am; the eclipse lasted 5 minutes 13 seconds. The team remained at Sobral until July to photograph the same star field at night.

The main telescope recorded twelve stars, while the backup one recorded seven. The main telescope had blurred images, which were discarded from the final conclusion though its estimated deflections were closer to the Newtonian-based prediction, while the smaller one had the clearest images and was deemed the most trustworthy and had an estimated deflection slightly above the Einsteinian prediction. Daniel Kennefick defends that without the Sobral photographs, the results of the 1919 eclipse would have been inconclusive and that the expeditions during future eclipses failed to improve the data.

The British team was joined by the Brazilian team led by Henrique Charles Morize and the astronomers Lélio Gama, Domingos Fernandes da Costa, Allyrio Hugueney de Mattos and Teófilo Lee with the objective of producing spectroscopic observations of the Sun's corona.

The team set its gear at a plaza in front of the church of Patrocínio, where the Eclipse Museum is today. The team took several 24-by-18 and 9-by-12 cm plates capturing the Sun and the stars' positions near its edge, but unfortunately, no meaningful conclusions were drawn from the data produced by the Brazilian team, and its contribution was defined as just logistical support for the British team and climate observations. Its plates were restored by the National Observatory in 2015, while the British team plates were lost after 1979.

The third expedition from that day was formed by Daniel Maynard Wise and Andrew Thomson, from the Carnegie Institution. Their goal was to study the eclipse effects on the magnetic field and atmospheric electricity.

In 1925, Einstein stated to the Brazilian press about the results, "The problem conceived by my brain was solved by the bright Brazilian sky".

=== Príncipe ===
The equipment used for the expedition to Príncipe, an island in the Gulf of Guinea off the coast of West Africa, was an astrographic lens borrowed from the Radcliffe Observatory in Oxford. Eddington sailed from England in March 1919. By mid-May he had his equipment set up on Príncipe near what was then Spanish Guinea. The eclipse was due to take place in the early afternoon of 29 May, at 2 pm, but that morning there was a storm with heavy rain. Eddington wrote:

The rain stopped about noon and about 1.30 ... we began to get a glimpse of the sun. We had to carry out our photographs in faith. I did not see the eclipse, being too busy changing plates, except for one glance to make sure that it had begun and another half-way through to see how much cloud there was. We took sixteen photographs. They are all good of the sun, showing a very remarkable prominence; but the cloud has interfered with the star images. The last few photographs show a few images which I hope will give us what we need ...

Eddington developed the photographs on Príncipe, and attempted to measure the change in the stellar positions during the eclipse. On 3 June, despite the clouds that had reduced the quality of the plates, Eddington recorded in his notebook: "... one plate I measured gave a result agreeing with Einstein."

British future astronomer and astrophysicist Cecilia Payne-Gaposchkin attended Eddington's lectures at Cambridge (including one where Eddington discussed the results of the eclipse expeditions) and later related how strongly these lectures had affected her.

== Results and publication ==
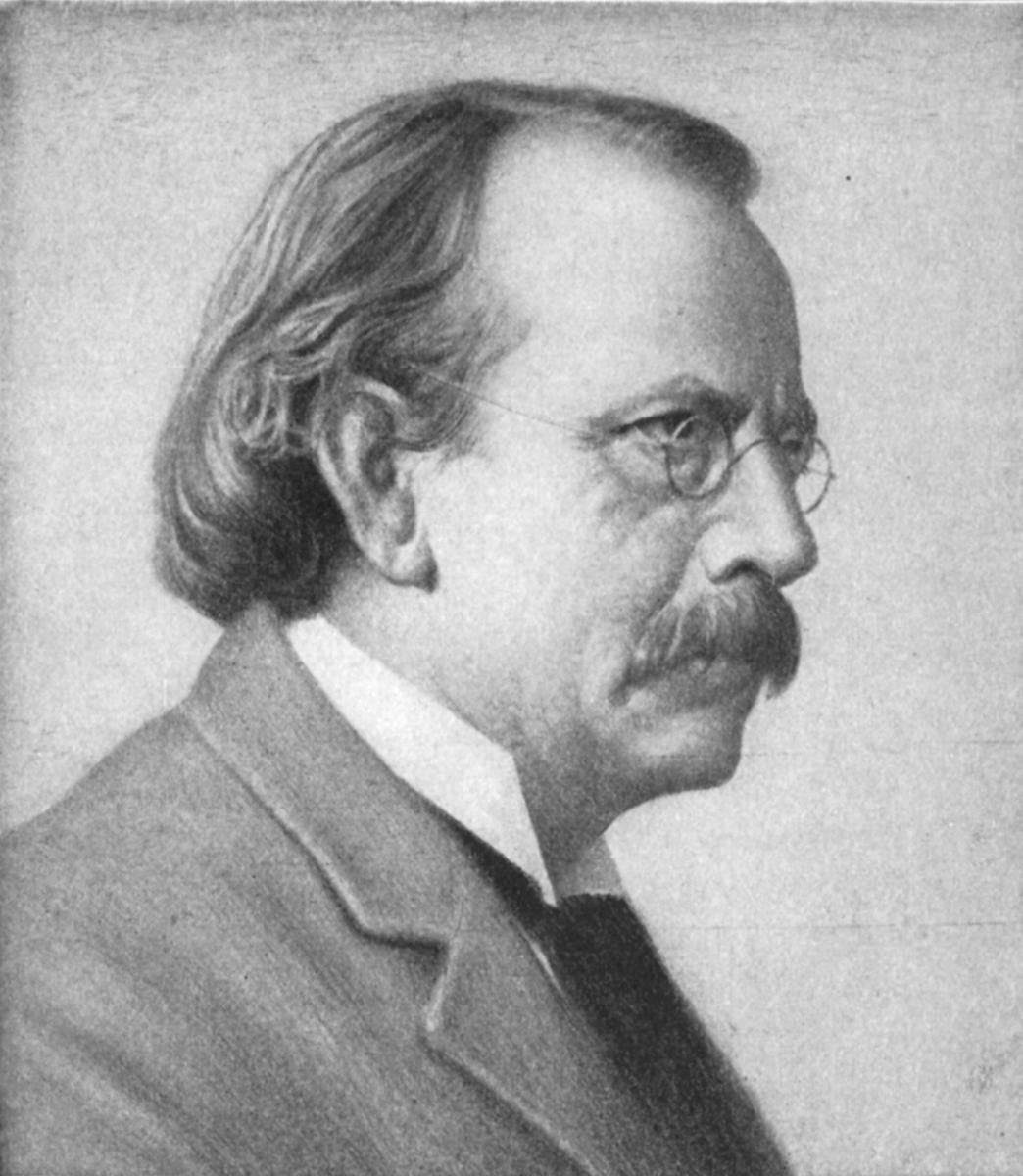
J. J. Thomson, President of the Royal Society, supported Eddington's conclusions.

The results were announced at a joint meeting of the Royal Society and Royal Astronomical Society in November 1919, and published in the Philosophical Transactions of the Royal Society in 1920. Following the return of the expedition, Eddington was addressing a dinner held by the Royal Astronomical Society, and, showing his more light-hearted side, recited the following verse that he had composed in a style parodying the Rubaiyat of Omar Khayyam:

Oh leave the Wise our measures to collate
One thing at least is certain, light has weight
One thing is certain and the rest debate
Light rays, when near the Sun, do not go straight.

— Arthur Stanley Eddington, RAS dinner

== Later replications ==
The light deflection measurements were repeated by expeditions that observed the total solar eclipse of 21 September 1922 in Australia. An important role in this was played by the Lick Observatory (Note: For a historical review emphasizing the role of the Lick team in the confirmation of light's bending, see Jeffrey Crelisnsten's 1983 article in Historical Studies in the Physical Sciences.) and the Mount Wilson Observatory, both in California, US. On 12 April 1923, William Wallace Campbell announced that the preliminary new results confirmed Einstein's theory of relativity and prediction of the amount of light deflection with measurements from over 200 stars. Final results published in 1928 used measurements of over 3,000 star images.

== Reception ==
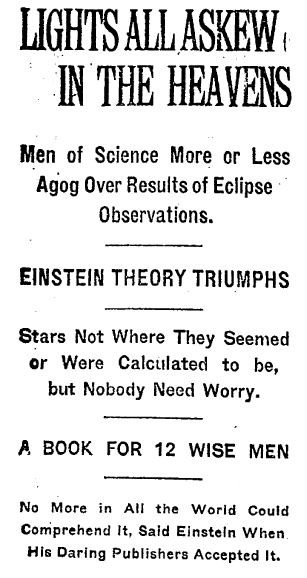
The New York Times of November 10, 1919, reported on Einstein's confirmed prediction.

The presentation of the results at the joint 6 November 1919 session of Royal Society and Royal Astronomical Society led to intensive press coverage first in Great Britain and a few days later in the US press, notably in The New York Times, and some days later still in the German press. While Einstein had been a moderately famous public figure in Germany for a few years by that time, the articles in question marked the beginning of his international celebrity status. A notable exception was Belgium, where the Eddington results were given the cold shoulder – partly because Einstein was seen as representing Germany, with the suffering of Belgium in World War I still very present in the country. The sudden popularity of Einstein's theories led to an "Einstein boom" of popular science books.

While there is a later anecdote describing Einstein as unimpressed about the experimental results, and sure of his theory even in the absence of evidence (stating, when asked what he would have said if the results had been otherwise, "Then I would feel sorry for the dear Lord. The theory is correct anyway.") the evidence of Einstein's letters to other scientists indicates, on the contrary, that he was both impressed and moved by the new results, and regarded them as an important success.

The 1919 results were also used as part of the systematic efforts by the Nobel laureate Philipp Lenard to discredit Einstein, whom Lenard, himself an avid national socialist and exponent of what he saw as "German physics", saw as a dangerous exponent of unnatural "Jewish physics". Lenard pointed to the 1801 prediction that Johann Georg von Soldner had derived from Newtonian gravity for starlight bending around a massive object, which corresponds to half the general-relativistic prediction derived by Einstein in 1915, and thus to Einstein's own earlier derivation of 1911, and claimed that it proved Einstein to be a plagiarist, and that von Soldner deserved to be given credit for the 1919 result.

Both the 1919 results themselves and Eddington's textbook on general relativity, whose second edition including the results saw numerous translations as interest in Einstein's theory grew, played important roles in the reception of Einstein's theory in the scientific community. It is notable that while the Eddington results were seen as a confirmation of Einstein's prediction, and in that capacity soon found their way into general relativity text books, among other astronomers there followed a decade-long discussion of the quantitative values of light deflection, with the precise results in contention even after several expeditions had repeated Eddington's observations on the occasion of subsequent eclipses. The discussion concerned both the data analysis – such as the different weight assigned to different stars in the 1922 and 1929 eclipse expeditions – and the question of specific systematic effects that could skew the results.

All in all, eclipse measurements of this kind, using visible light, retained considerable uncertainty, and it was only radio-astronomical measurements in the late 1960s that definitively showed that the amount of deflection was the full value predicted by general relativity, and not half that number as predicted by a "Newtonian" calculation. Those measurements and their successors are nowadays an important part of the so-called post-Newtonian tests of gravity, the systematic way of parametrizing the predictions of general relativity and other theories in terms of ten adjustable parameters in the context of the parameterized post-Newtonian formalism, where each parameter represents a possible departure from Newton's law of universal gravitation. The earliest parameterizations of the post-Newtonian approximation were performed by Eddington (1922). The parameter concerned with the amount of deflection of light by a gravitational source is the so-called Eddington parameter (γ), and it is currently the best-constrained of the ten post-Newtonian parameters.

At about the time of the last serious photo-plate eclipse measurements, by a University of Texas expedition observing in Mauritania in 1973, doubts began to surface about whether or not the original Eddington measurements were sufficient to vindicate Einstein's prediction, or whether biased analysis by Eddington and his colleagues had skewed the results. Similar concerns about systematic errors and possibly confirmation bias were raised in the science history community and gained more prominence as part of the popular book The Golem by Trevor Pinch and Harry Collins. A modern reanalysis of the dataset, though, suggests that Eddington's analysis was accurate, and in fact less afflicted by bias than some of the analyses of solar eclipse data that followed. Part of the vindication comes from a 1979 reanalysis of the plates from the two Sobral instruments, using a much more modern plate-measuring machine than was available in 1919, which supports Eddington's results.

The Eddington Experiment was crucial for inspiring Karl Popper's theory of falsifiability, the central idea of The Logic of Scientific Discovery and a core part of the scientific method. The concept of falsifiability says that all scientific theories, to count as scientific, must have an associated scientific experiment or experiments which could, in principle, prove the theory wrong. Popper cites Albert Einstein's theory of general relativity as an example of good science because it is falsifiable, and the Eddington Experiment is an example of an experiment which could have falsified the theory but didn't. Popper contrasts this with Sigmund Freud's psychoanalysis, which he claims cannot be tested by experiment, meaning that psychoanalysis is unfalsifiable and therefore pseudoscience.

== In popular culture ==
The experiment was central to the plot of the 2008 BBC television film Einstein and Eddington, with David Tennant in the role of Eddington.

== See also ==
- Tests of general relativity
- Einstein and Eddington

== Sources and further reading ==
- Collins, Harry; Pinch, Trevor (1993). The Golem: What everyone should know about science. Cambridge University Press. ISBN 0521477360.
- Cowen, Ron (May 2019). Gravity's Century: From Einstein's Eclipse to Images of Black Holes (Illustrated ed.). Harvard University Press. ISBN 978-0-674-97496-8.
- Crelinsten, Jeffrey (May 2006). Einstein's Jury: The Race to Test Relativity. Princeton University Press. ISBN 978-0-691-12310-3.
- Gates, Sylvester J. Jr; Pelletier, Cathie (2019). Proving Einstein right: The daring expeditions that changed how we look at the universe (First ed.). New York: PublicAffairs. ISBN 978-1541762251.
- Kennefick, Daniel (2019). No Shadow of a Doubt: The 1919 Eclipse That Confirmed Einstein's Theory of Relativity. Princeton: Princeton University Press. ISBN 9780691183862.
- Popper, Karl (2002) [1935]. The Logic of Scientific Discovery. Routledge. ISBN 0-203-99462-0.
- Stanley, Matthew (2019). Einstein's War: How Relativity Triumphed Amid the Vicious Nationalism of World War I. Dutton. ISBN 978-1-5247-4541-7.
