= Eric Becklin =

American astrophysicist

Eric Edward Becklin
- Born: 6 April 1940
- Citizenship: USA
- Education: B.S. (Physics) University of Minnesota, 1963; Ph.D. (Physics) California Institute of Technology, 1968
- Known for: infrared astronomy airborne observatories

Eric E. Becklin (born 6 April 1940) is an American astrophysicist. The primary focus of Becklin's research is infrared imaging and spectroscopy, including the search for brown dwarfs, the detection of circumstellar dust rings, the dynamics and composition of the center of the Milky Way galaxy, and the nature of luminous infrared galaxies.

Becklin received his Ph.D. in physics from the California Institute of Technology His thesis advisor was Gerry Neugebauer, and his thesis was Infrared Observation of the Galatic [sic] Center. A faculty member since 1989, Becklin is a Professor Emeritus of Physics and Astronomy at University of California, Los Angeles (UCLA). Named Stratospheric Observatory for Infrared Astronomy (SOFIA) Chief Scientist in 1996, he was the first director of the NASA Infrared Telescope Facility (IRTF) at Mauna Kea, Hawaii and a principal investigator on the Kuiper Airborne Observatory (KAO).

On August 23, 2012, in a ceremony held at Dryden Flight Research Center (now the Armstrong Flight Research Center), Becklin received the NASA Exceptional Public Service Medal “for excellence as a pioneer in the infrared astronomy field and providing key leadership for the scientific success of the Stratospheric Observatory for Infrared Astronomy.” He was awarded the Henry Norris Russell Lectureship by the American Astronomical Society in 2017.

In 1966, Becklin and Gerry Neugebauer discovered an exceptionally bright infrared source within Orion known today as the Becklin-Neugebauer Object. He was elected a Fellow of the American Academy of Arts and Sciences in 2009.

In 1988, while returning home from an observing run on Mauna Kea, Becklin was a passenger on Aloha Airlines Flight 243, which underwent explosive decompression and had to make an emergency landing in Maui.
