= Becklin–Neugebauer Object =

Infrared emitting object in the constellation Orion

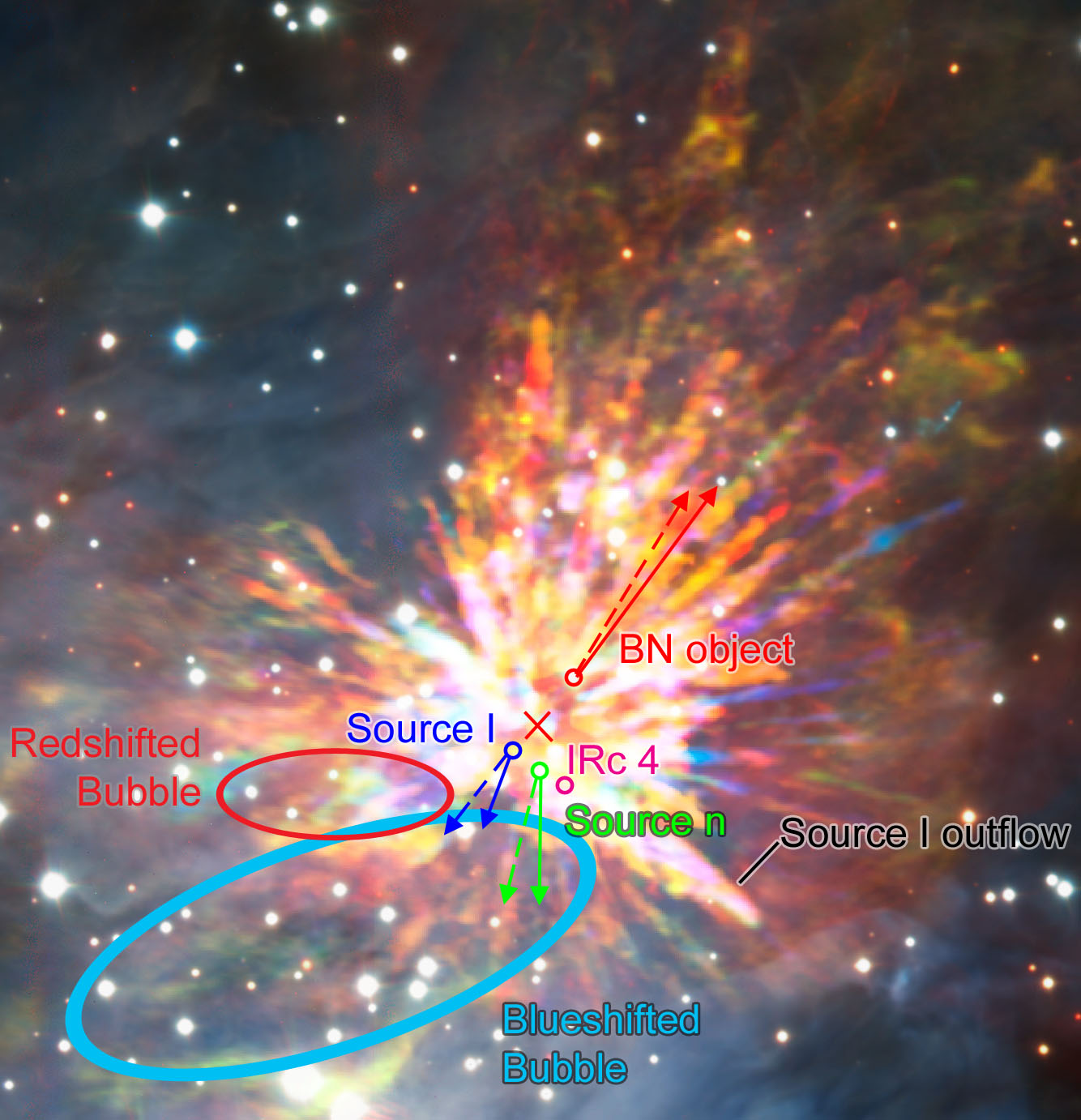
- This image shows the explosion in Orion that likely ejected the stars Becklin–Neugebauer Object, source I and source n.

Observation data Epoch J2000.0 Equinox ICRS
- Constellation: Orion
- Right ascension: 05^{h} 35^{m} 14.113^{s}
- Declination: −05° 22′ 22.73″

Characteristics
- Spectral type: B

Astrometry
Distance	~1500 ly

Details
Mass	7 M_{☉}

Other designations
- Becklin-Neugebauer Object, Orion-BN, Becklin's Star, V2254 Ori, 2MASS J05351411-0522227

Database references
SIMBAD	data

The Becklin–Neugebauer Object (BN) is an object visible only in the infrared in the Orion molecular cloud 1 (OMC1). It was discovered in 1967 by Eric Becklin and Gerry Neugebauer during their near-infrared survey of the Orion Nebula. A faint glow around the center-most stars can be observed in the visible light spectrum, especially with the aid of a telescope.

The BN Object is thought to be an intermediate-mass protostar. It was the first star detected using infrared methods and is deeply embedded within the Orion star-forming nebula, where it is invisible at optical wavelengths because the light is completely scattered or absorbed due to the high density of dusty material.

Near-infrared polarized light observations showed that the star BN is still surrounded by a circumstellar disk.

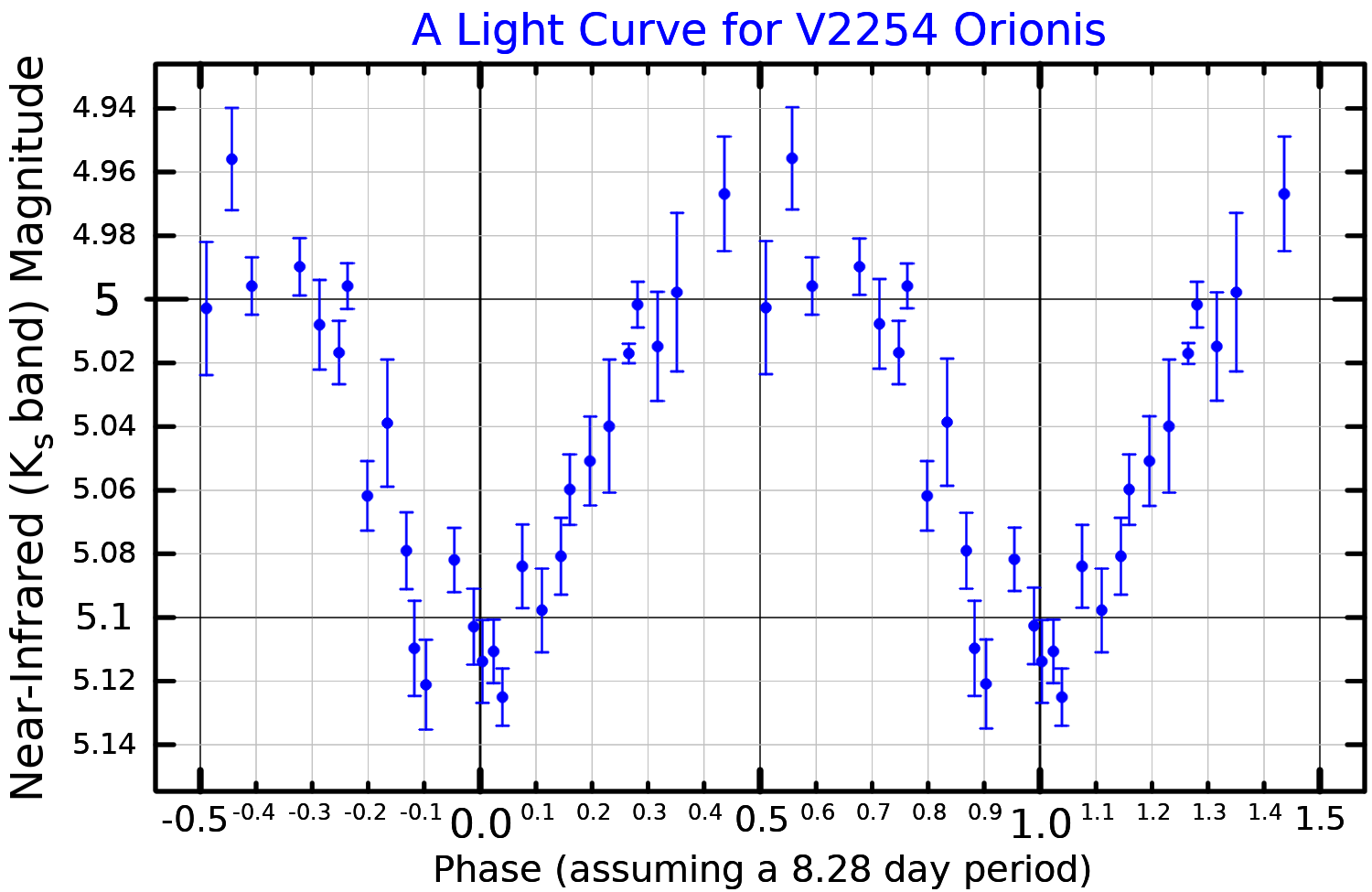
A near-infrared K_{s} band light curve for V2254 Orionis, adapted from Hillenbrand et al. (2001)

== Naming ==
This object is most commonly known as the Becklin–Neugebauer Object after its discoverers, Eric Becklin and Gerry Neugebauer. This name can be abbreviated as "BN Object", "Orion-BN" or simply "BN". It is also sometimes called Becklin's Star. Stellarium wrongly associates the name "Becklin's Star" with Theta1 Orionis C.

Other designations include the variable star designation V2254 Orionis, and IRC −10093, though SIMBAD lists the latter as a separate object.

== Past ejection of BN ==
BN moves towards the northwest with respect to other stars in the Kleinmann-Low nebula. A proper motion of between 21 and 27 km/s in the northwest region and a redshift of about 11 km/s with respect to the OMC1 was measured for this star. BN is therefore considered a runaway star.

It was proposed that Theta1Ori C ejected BN about 4000 years ago, but it is more likely that BN and two other runaway stars, called Source I (Src I) and Source n (Src n), were ejected from a position about 500 years ago. Source I and Source n both move in opposite directions, away from BN.

With more recent VLA proper motion measurements it was realised that at least six compact sources recede from a common point: BN, source I, Orion MR (formerly source n), X, IRc23 and Zapata 11. Almost all these sources were ejected about 500 years ago. The ejection of BN and source I was proposed to have occurred in the year 1475±6 (about 550 years ago). IRc23 was ejected only 300 years ago.

At the time of the ejection four or more protostars dynamically interacted with each other, leading to the ejection of the stars in different directions. In the classical three-body scenario, the dynamical interaction either formed a compact binary or the merger of two stars. The large number of ejected stars suggest a more complex interaction, such as the interaction of a tight binary with a compact star cluster.

This dynamical interaction released a large amount of energy, causing an infrared-only flare on the scale of a nova or supernova with an energy of about 10^{48} erg.

Alternatively the explosion was not a multi-system interaction but a supernova.

=== Explosion remnant ===
The remnant of the explosion is called the Kleinmann–Low Nebula. Multi-wavelength observations and carbon monoxide (CO) observations with ALMA reveal the mostly spherical remnant of an explosion at the intersection point of the BN object and Source I. The ALMA observations revealed hundreds of CO streamers moving with up to 100 km/s. Some of these CO streamers nearly reach the shocked gas and dust observed in molecular hydrogen and iron [Fe II].

== Gallery ==
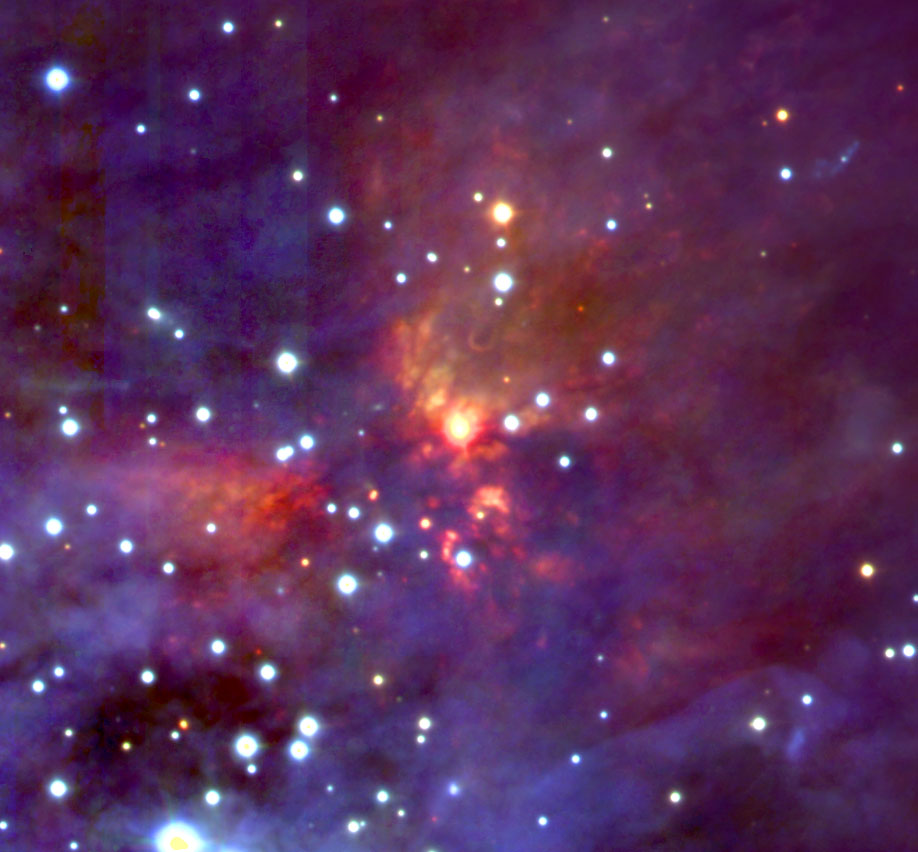
The BN object (bright star in the center) in near-infrared with ESO HAWKI.

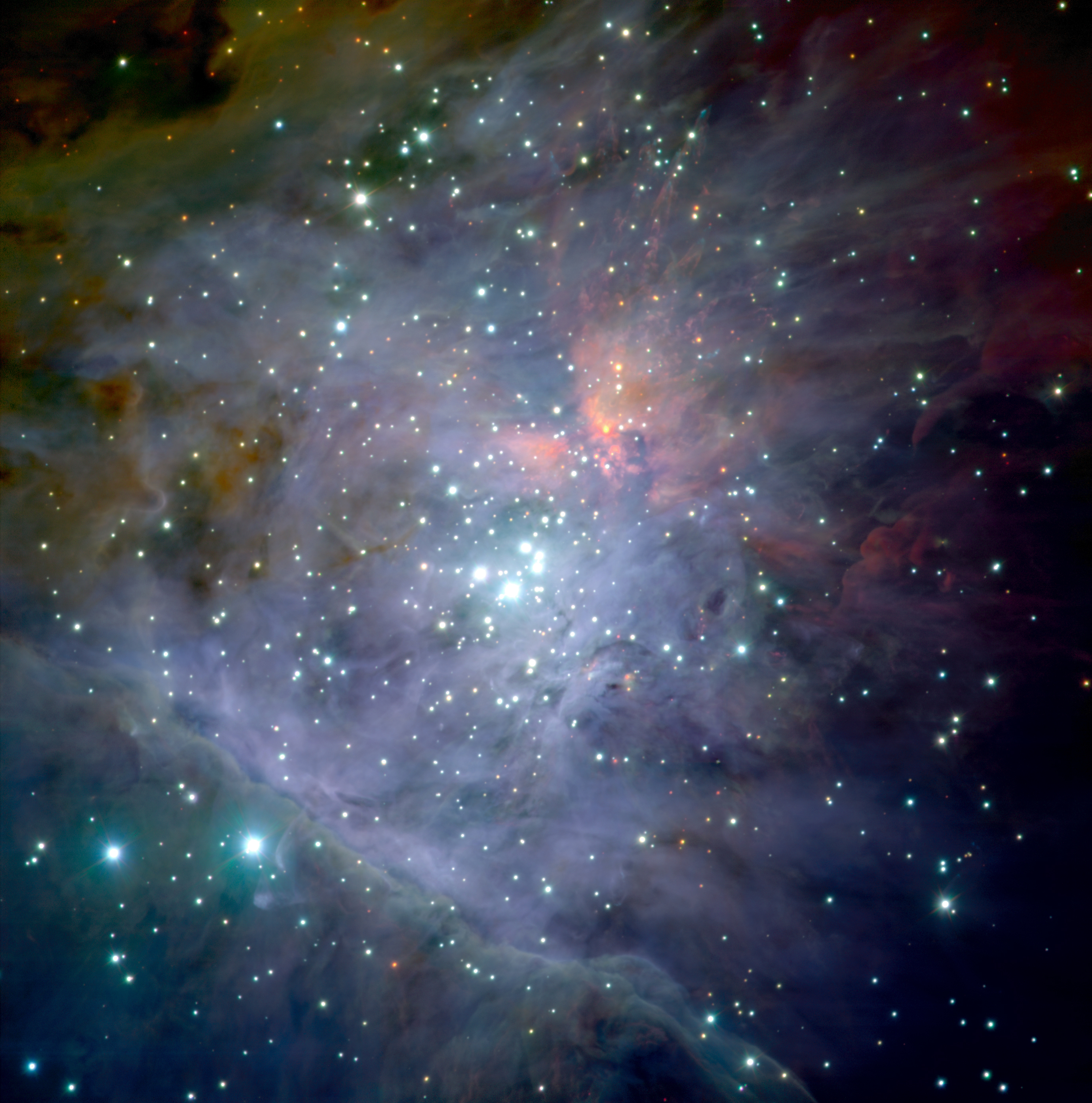
Near-infrared view of the central region of the Orion Nebula. In the center is the Trapezium cluster and the red region above contains the BN object.

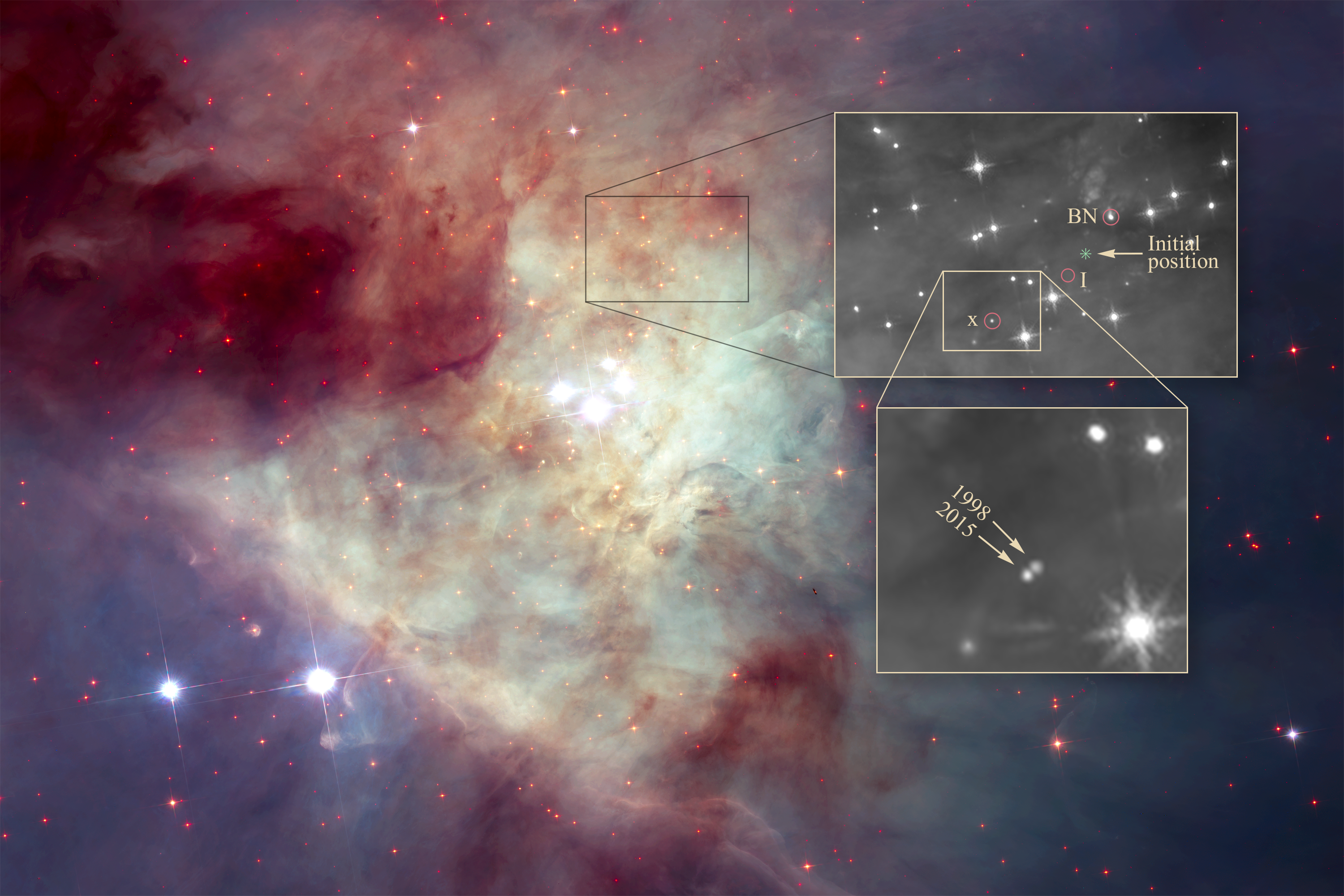
Hubble image showing the proper motion of source x away from the explosion center. The image also shows the BN object.
