= Vectorial Mechanics =

1948 book by Edward Arthur Milne

- Title page for Vectorial Mechanics (1948)
- Author: Edward Arthur Milne
- Language: English
- Subject: Vector manipulation
- Genre: Mathematics
- Publication date: 1948

Vectorial Mechanics (1948) is a book on vector manipulation (i.e., vector methods) by Edward Arthur Milne, a highly decorated (e.g., James Scott Prize Lectureship) British astrophysicist and mathematician. Milne states that the text was due to conversations (circa 1924) with his then-colleague and erstwhile teacher Sydney Chapman who viewed vectors not merely as a pretty toy but as a powerful weapon of applied mathematics. Milne states that he did not at first believe Chapman, holding on to the idea that "vectors were like a pocket-rule, which needs to be unfolded before it can be applied and used." In time, however, Milne convinces himself that Chapman was right.

== Summary ==
Vectorial Mechanics has 18 chapters grouped into 3 parts. Part I is on vector algebra including chapters on a definition of a vector, products of vectors, elementary tensor analysis, and integral theorems. Part II is on systems of line vectors including chapters on line co-ordinates, systems of line vectors, statics of rigid bodies, the displacement of a rigid body, and the work of a system of line vectors. Part III is on dynamics including kinematics, particle dynamics, types of particle motion, dynamics of systems of particles, rigid bodies in motion, dynamics of rigid bodies, motion of a rigid body about its center of mass, gyrostatic problems, and impulsive motion.

== Summary of reviews ==
There were significant reviews given near the time of original publication.

G.J.Whitrow:

Although many books have been published in recent years in which vector and tensor methods are used for solving problems in geometry and mathematical physics, there has been a lack of first-class treatises which explain the methods in full detail and are nevertheless suitable for the undergraduate student. In applied mathematics no book has appeared till now which is comparable with Hardy's Pure Mathematics. ... Just as in Hardy's classic, a new note is struck at the very start: a precise definition is given of the concept "free vector", analogous to the Frege-Russell definition of "cardinal number." According to Milne, a free vector is the class of all its representations, a typical representation being defined in the customary manner. From a pedagogic point of view, however, the reviewer wonders whether it might have been better to draw attention at this early stage to a concrete instance of a free vector. The student familiar with physical concepts which have magnitude and position, but not direction, should be made to realise from the very beginning that the free vector is not merely "fundamental in discussing systems of position vectors and systems of line-vectors", but occurs naturally in its own right, as there are physical concepts which have magnitude and direction but not position, e.g. the couple in statics, and the angular velocity of a rigid body. Although the necessary existence theorems must be established at a later stage, and Milne's rigorous proofs are particularly welcome, there is no reason why some instances of free vectors should not be mentioned at this point."

Daniel C. Lewis:

The reviewer has long felt that the role of vector analysis in mechanics has been much overemphasized. It is true that the fundamental equations of motion in their various forms, especially in the case of rigid bodies, can be derived with greatest economy of thought by use of vectors (assuming that the requisite technique has already been developed); but once the equations have been set up, the usual procedure is to drop vector methods in their solution. If this position can be successfully refuted, this has been done in the present work, the most novel feature of which is to solve the vector differential equations by vector methods without ever writing down the corresponding scalar differential equations obtained by taking components. The author has certainly been successful in showing that this can be done in fairly simple, though nontrivial, cases. To give an example of a definitely nontrivial problem solved in this way, one might mention the nonholonomic problem afforded by the motion of a sphere rolling on a rough inclined plane or on a rough spherical surface. The author's methods are interesting and aesthetically satisfying and therefore deserve the widest publication even if they partake of the nature of a tour de force.
