= Mestel =

Mestel is a surname. Notable people with the surname include:

- A. L. Mestel (1926–2022), American pediatric surgeon and artist
- Jonathan Mestel (born 1957), British mathematician and chess player
- Leon Mestel (1927–2017), Australian astronomer
- Solomon Mestel (1886–1966), Australian rabbi
