= Angular momentum problem =

Problem in astrophysics

The angular momentum problem is a problem in astrophysics identified by Leon Mestel in 1965.

It was found that the angular momentum of a protoplanetary disk is misappropriated when compared to models during stellar birth. The Sun and other stars are predicted by models to be rotating considerably faster than they actually are. The Sun, for example, only accounts for about 0.3 percent of the total angular momentum of the Solar System while about 60% is attributed to Jupiter.

== See also ==
- History of Solar System formation and evolution hypotheses
