= Whitrow =

Whitrow is a surname. Notable people with the surname include:

- Benjamin Whitrow (1937–2017), British actor
- Gerald James Whitrow (1912–2000), British mathematician, cosmologist and science historian
