= Richard Paris =

Richard Paris may refer to:

- Richard Paris (cyclist)
- Richard Paris (production designer)
- Richard Bruce Paris (1946–2022), British mathematician
