= Blanketing effect =

The blanketing effect (also referred to as line blanketing or the line-blanketing effect) is the enhancement of the red or infrared regions of a stellar spectrum at the expense of the other regions, with an overall diminishing effect on the whole spectrum. Line blanketing can also occur in the ultraviolet band, as for example, in magnetic chemically peculiar stars. The term originates in a 1928 article by astrophysicist Edward Arthur Milne, where it was used to describe the effects that the astronomical metals in a star's outer regions had on that star's spectrum. The name arose because the absorption lines act as a "blanket", causing the continuum temperature of the spectrum to rise over what it would have been if these lines were not present.

Astronomical metals, which produce most of a star's spectral absorption lines, absorb a fraction of the star's radiant energy (a phenomenon known as the blocking effect, or line blocking) and then re-emit it at a lower frequency as part of the backwarming effect. The combination of both these effects results in the position of stars in a color-color diagram to shift towards redder areas as the proportion of metals in them increases. The blanketing effect is thus highly dependent on the metallicity index of a star, which indicates the fraction of elements other than hydrogen and helium that compose it.
