= James Scott Prize Lectureship =

The James Scott Prize Lectureship is given every four years by the Royal Society of Edinburgh for a lecture on the fundamental concepts of Natural Philosophy. The prize was established in 1918 as a memorial to James Scott by trustees of his estate.

Years: Recipient	Lecture Title
1918-1922: Alfred North Whitehead	The Relatedness of Nature (delivered 5 June 1922)
1922-1927: Joseph Larmor	The Grasp of Mind on Nature (delivered 4 July 1927)
1927-1930: Niels Bohr	Philosophical Aspects of Atomic Theory (delivered 26 May 1930)
1930-1933: Arnold Sommerfeld	Ways to the Knowledge of Nature (delivered 1 May 1933)
1933-1938: P. A. M. Dirac	The Relation between Mathematics and Physics (delivered 6 February 1939)
1940-1943: Edward Arthur Milne	Fundamental Concepts of Natural Philosophy
1945-1948: Herbert Dingle	The Nature of Scientific Philosophy (delivered 5 July 1948)
1955-1958: C.D. Broad	Some Remarks on Change, Continuity, and Discontinuity (delivered 11 November 1957)
1958-1961: Herbert Butterfield	The Place of the Scientific Revolution in the History of Thought
1960-1963: Hermann Bondi	?
1963-1966: William Lawrence Bragg	The Spirit of Science (delivered 3 July 1967)
1966-1970: Karl Popper	Conjectural Knowledge: My Solution of the Problem of Induction (delivered 7 June 1971)
1970-1974: Nicholas Kurti	Meditations on Heat and Cold (date delivered 25 October 1976)
1974-1979: D.W. Sciama	The Beginning and End of the Universe (delivered 7 June 1982)
1984-1987: W. Cochran	?
1993-1996: Peter Higgs	?
1997-2000: Roger Penrose	?
2001-2004: Michael Berry	Making Light of Mathematics (delivered 9 December 2002)
2005-2008: Stephen M. Barnett	Security, Insecurity, Paranoia and Quantum Mechanics (delivered 4 February 2008)
