= Grey atmosphere =

The grey atmosphere (or gray) is a useful set of approximations made for radiative transfer applications in studies of stellar atmospheres (atmospheres of stars) based on the simplified notion that the absorption coefficient $\alpha_{\nu}$ of matter within a star's atmosphere is constant—that is, unchanging—for all frequencies of the star's incident radiation.

== Application ==
The grey atmosphere approximation is the primary method astronomers use to determine the temperature and basic radiative properties of astronomical objects, including planets with atmospheres, the Sun, other stars, and interstellar clouds of gas and dust. Although the simplified model of grey atmosphere approximation demonstrates good correlation to observations, it deviates from observational results because real atmospheres are not grey, e.g. radiation absorption is frequency-dependent.

== Approximations ==
The primary approximation is based on the assumption that the absorption coefficient, typically represented by an $\alpha_{\nu}$, has no dependence on frequency $\nu$ for the frequency range being worked in, e.g. $\alpha_{\nu} \longrightarrow \alpha$.

Typically a number of other assumptions are made simultaneously:

1. The atmosphere has a plane-parallel atmosphere geometry.
2. The atmosphere is in a thermal radiative equilibrium.

This set of assumptions leads directly to the mean intensity and source function being directly equivalent to a blackbody Planck function of the temperature at that optical depth.

The Eddington approximation (see next section) may also be used optionally, to solve for the source function. This greatly simplifies the model without greatly distorting results.

== Derivation of source function using the Eddington Approximation ==
Deriving various quantities from the grey atmosphere model involves solving an integro-differential equation, an exact solution of which is complex. Therefore, this derivation takes advantage of a simplification known as the Eddington Approximation. Starting with an application of a plane-parallel model, we can imagine an atmospheric model built up of plane-parallel layers stacked on top of each other, where properties such as temperature are constant within a plane. This means that such parameters are function of physical depth $z$, where the direction of positive $z$ points towards the upper layers of the atmosphere. From this it is easy to see that a ray path $ds$ at angle $\theta$ to the vertical, is given by

$\mathrm ds = \frac{\mathrm dz}{\cos\theta}$

We now define optical depth as

$\mathrm d\tau = -\alpha\mathrm ds$

where $\alpha$ is the absorption coefficient associated with the various constituents of the atmosphere. We now turn to the radiation transfer equation

$\frac{\mathrm dI}{\mathrm ds} = j - \alpha I$

where $I$ is the total specific intensity, $j$ is the emission coefficient. After substituting for $\mathrm ds$ and dividing by $-\alpha$ we have

$\mu \frac{\mathrm d I}{\mathrm d\tau} = I - S$

where $\mu = \cos\theta$, and $S$ is the so-called total source function defined as the ratio between emission and absorption coefficients. This differential equation can by solved by multiplying both sides by $e^{-\tau/\mu}$, re-writing the lefthand side as $\frac{\mathrm d}{\mathrm d\tau}(Ie^{-\tau/\mu})$ and then integrating the whole equation with respect to $\tau$. This gives the solution

$I(\tau, \mu) = \frac{e^{\frac{\tau}{\mu}}}{\mu}\int^{\infty}_{\tau}Se^{-\frac{\tau}{\mu}}\mathrm d\tau$

where we have used the limits $\tau \in [\tau, \infty)$ as we are integrating outward from some depth within the atmosphere; therefore $\mu \in [0, 1]$. Even though we have neglected the frequency-dependence of parameters such as $S$, we know that it is a function of optical depth therefore in order to integrate this we need to have a method for deriving the source function. We now define some important parameters such as energy density $U$, total flux $F$ and radiation pressure $P$ as follows

$U = \frac{2\pi}{c}\int^{+1}_{-1}I\mathrm d\mu$

$F = 2\pi \int^{+1}_{-1}I\mu\mathrm d\mu$

$P = \frac{2\pi}{c}\int^{+1}_{-1}I\mu^{2}\mathrm d\mu$

We also define the average specific intensity (averaged over all angles) as

$J = \frac{1}{2}\int^{+1}_{-1}I\mathrm d\mu$

We see immediately that by dividing the radiative transfer equation by 2 and integrating over $\mu$, we have

$\frac{1}{4\pi}\frac{\mathrm dF}{\mathrm d\tau} = J - S$

Furthermore, by multiplying the same equation by $\frac{\mu}{2}$ and integrating w.r.t. $\mu$, we have

$\frac{\mathrm dP}{\mathrm d\tau} = \frac{F}{c}$

By substituting the average specific intensity J into the definition of energy density, we also have the following relationship

$J = \frac{c}{4\pi}U$

Now, total flux must remain constant through the atmosphere therefore

$\frac{\mathrm dF}{\mathrm d\tau} = 0 \iff J = S$

This condition is known as radiative equilibrium. Taking advantage of the constancy of total flux, we now integrate $\frac{dP}{d\tau}$ to obtain

$P = \frac{F}{c}(\tau + C)$

where $C$ is a constant of integration. We know from thermodynamics that for an isotropic gas the following relationship holds

$P = \frac{1}{3}U = \frac{4\pi}{3c}J$

where we have substituted the relationship between energy density and average specific intensity derived earlier. Although this may be true for lower depths within the stellar atmosphere, near the surface it almost certainly isn't. However, the Eddington Approximation assumes this to hold at all levels within the atmosphere. Substituting this in the previous equation for pressure gives

$J = \frac{3F}{4\pi}(\tau + C)$

and under the condition of radiative equilibrium

$S = \frac{3F}{4\pi}(\tau + C)$

This means we have solved the source function except for a constant of integration. Substituting this result into the solution to the radiation transfer equation and integrating gives

$I(\tau = 0, \mu) = \frac{3F}{4\pi}\frac{e^{\tau/\mu}}{\mu}\int^{\infty}_{0}(\tau + C)e^{-\tau/\mu}\mathrm d\tau = \frac{3F}{4\pi}(\mu + C)\ \ \ \ \ \ \ \ \ \ \ \ \ \ \ \mathrm{for}\ \mu > 0$

Here we have set the lower limit of $\tau$ to zero, which is the value of optical depth at the surface of the atmosphere. This would represent radiation coming out of, say, the surface of the Sun. Finally, substituting this into the definition of total flux and integrating gives

$F = 2\pi \int^{1}_{0}I\mu \mathrm d\mu = \frac{3F}{2} \int^{1}_{0}(\mu^{2} + C\mu)\mathrm d\mu = \frac{3F}{2}\left(\frac{1}{3} + \frac{C}{2}\right)$

Therefore, $C = \frac{2}{3}$ and the source function is given by

$S(\tau) = \frac{3F}{4\pi}\left(\tau + \frac{2}{3}\right)$

== Temperature solution ==
Integrating the first and second moments of the radiative transfer equation, applying the above relation and the Two-Stream Limit approximation leads to information about each of the higher moments in $\cos \theta$. The first moment of the mean intensity, $H$ is constant regardless of optical depth:

$H(\tau) = H$

The second moment of the mean intensity, $K$ is then given by:

$K(\tau) = \tau H + \frac{2}{3} H = \frac{1}{3} J(\tau)$

Note that the Eddington approximation is a direct consequence of these assumptions.

Defining an effective temperature $T_{\rm{eff}}$ for the Eddington flux $H$ and applying the Stefan–Boltzmann law, realize this relation between the externally observed effective temperature and the internal blackbody temperature $T$ of the medium.

$T^4 = T_{\rm{eff}}^4 \frac{3}{4} \left( \tau + \frac{2}{3} \right)$

The results of the grey atmosphere solution: The observed temperature $T_{\rm{eff}}$ is a good measure of the true temperature $T$ at an optical depth $\tau \approx 2/3$ and the atmosphere top temperature is $\approx 0.841T_{\rm{eff}}$.

This approximation makes the source function linear in optical depth.
