= Selig Brodetsky =

English mathematician (1888–1954)

- זליג ברודצקי
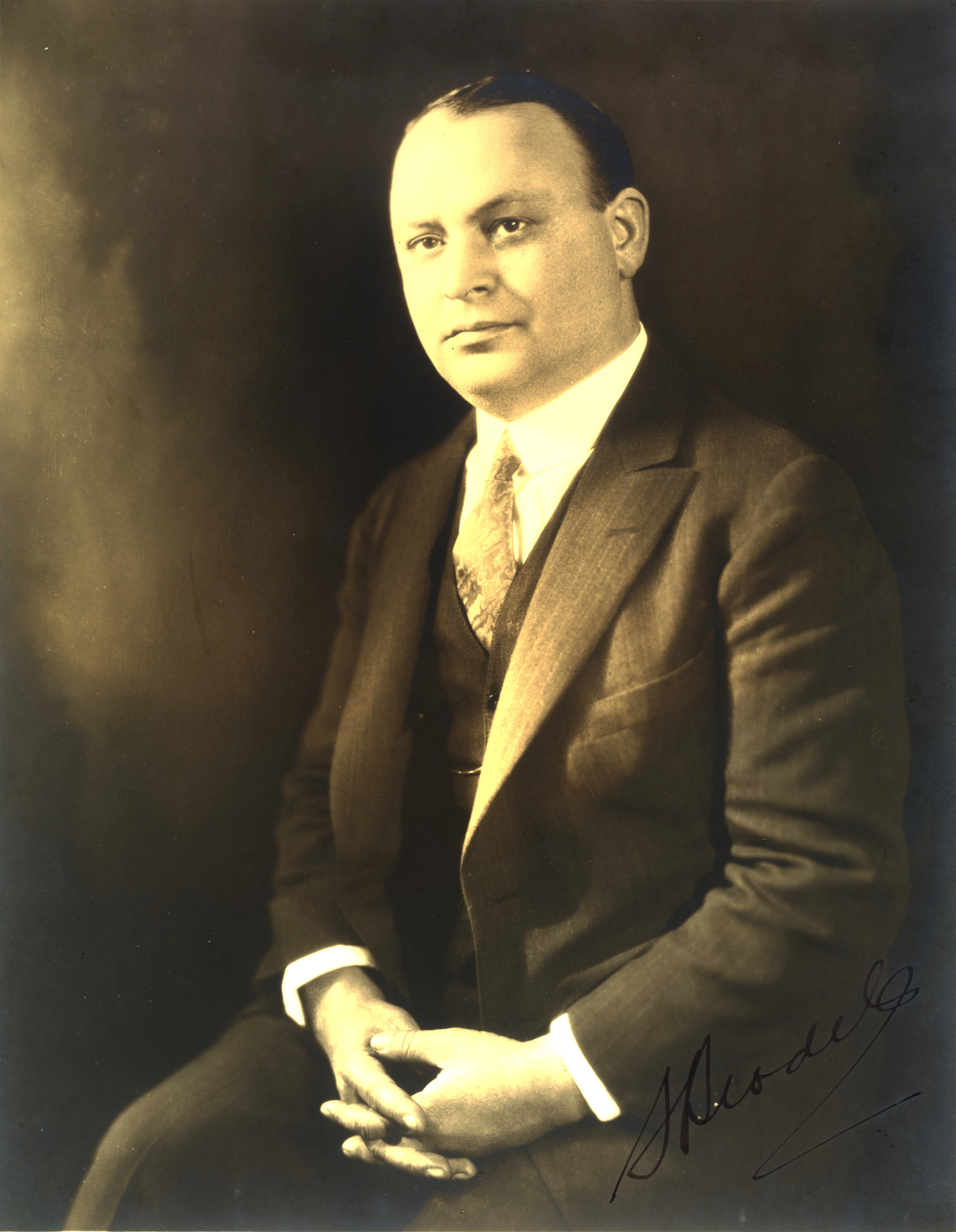
- Born: 10 February 1888; Olviopol, Kherson Governorate, Russian Empire
- Died: 18 May 1954 (aged 66); London, England
- Resting place: Willesden Jewish Cemetery
- Education: Jews' Free School
- Alma mater: Trinity College, Cambridge, Leipzig University
- Occupation: Mathematician
- Spouse: Manya Berenblum
- Children: 1 son, 1 daughter
- Parent(s): Akiva Brodetsky; Adel Prober
- Relatives: Solomon Mestel (brother-in-law); Leon Mestel (nephew)

Selig Brodetsky (Hebrew: אשר זליג ברודצקי, romanized: Asher Zelig Brodetsky; 10 February 1888 – 18 May 1954) was an English mathematician, a member of the World Zionist Executive, the president of the Board of Deputies of British Jews, and the second president of the Hebrew University of Jerusalem.

== Background ==
Brodetsky was born in Olviopol (now Pervomaisk) in the Kherson Governorate of the Russian Empire (present-day Ukraine), the second of 13 children born to Akiva Brodetsky (the beadle of the local synagogue) and Adel (Prober). As a child, he witnessed the murder of his uncle in a pogrom. In 1894, the family followed Akiva to the East End of London, to where he had migrated a year earlier. Brodetsky attended the Jews' Free School, where he excelled at his studies. He was awarded a scholarship, which enabled him to attend the Central Foundation Boys' School of London and subsequently, in 1905, Trinity College, Cambridge.

In 1908, he completed his studies with highest honours being Senior Wrangler, to the distress of the conservative press, which was forced to recognise that a son of immigrants surpassed all the local students. The Newton scholarship enabled him to study at Leipzig University where he was awarded a doctorate in 1913. His dissertation dealt with the gravitational field.

In 1919, he married Manya Berenblum, whose family had recently emigrated from Belgium, where her father had been a diamond merchant in Antwerp. They had two children, Paul and Adele, in 1924 and 1927.

== Academic career ==
In 1914, Brodetsky was appointed a lecturer in applied mathematics at the University of Bristol. During the First World War he was employed as an advisor to the British company developing periscopes for submarines.

In 1919, Brodetsky became a lecturer at the University of Leeds. Five years later he was appointed professor of applied mathematics at Leeds where he remained until 1948. Much of his work concerned aeronautics and mechanics of aeroplanes. He was the head of the mathematics department of the University of Leeds from 1946 to 1948. He was active in the Association of University Teachers, serving as president in 1935–1936.

Brodetsky became the second president of the Hebrew University of Jerusalem in 1949, preceded by Sir Leon Simon, serving until 1952, and followed by Benjamin Mazar (1953 to 1961), at a time when the university was going through a rocky period, eventually having to abandon its campus on Mount Scopus. He attempted to overhaul the structure of the university but he soon became embroiled in bitter struggles with the University Senate, which interfered in his academic and bureaucratic work. Apparently, Brodetsky thought that he was going to take up a position similar to that of Vice-Chancellor of an English university but many in Jerusalem saw the position as essentially an honorary one, like the Chancellor of an English university. This struggle affected his health and in 1952 he decided to resign his post and return to England.

== Education ==
- Jews' Free School (JFS), London (where there is now a Brodetsky House in his honour)
- Central Foundation Boys' School, London
- Trinity College, Cambridge (senior wrangler, 1908)
- Leipzig University (PhD)

== Career ==
- Lecturer in Applied Mathematics, University of Bristol, 1914–1919
- Reader, 1920–1924; Professor, 1924–1948 then Emeritus Professor of Applied Mathematics, University of Leeds
- President of the Hebrew University of Jerusalem and Chairman of its Executive Council, 1949–1951

== Other posts ==
- Member of the Executive, World Zionist Organisation and Jewish Agency for Palestine
- Honorary President, Zionist Federation of Great Britain and Ireland
- Honorary President, Maccabi World Union
- President, Board of Deputies of British Jews (1940–1949)

He was a Fellow of the Royal Astronomical Society, Royal Aeronautical Society and Institute of Physics.

His sister Rachel married Rabbi Solomon Mestel; their son is astronomer and astrophysicist Leon Mestel.
