= History of Solar System formation and evolution hypotheses =

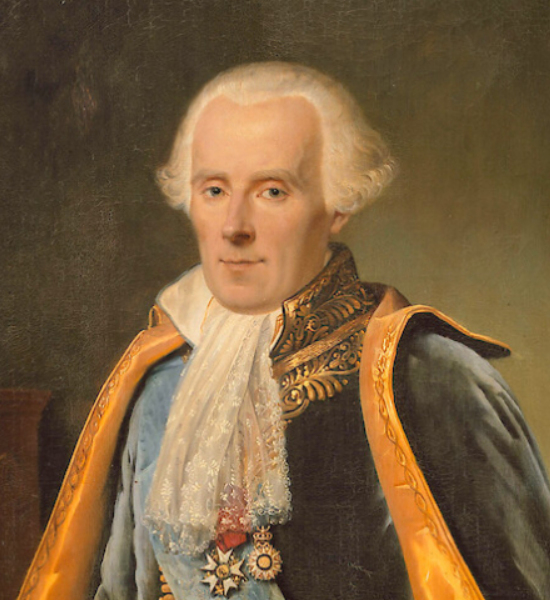
Pierre-Simon Laplace, one of the originators of the nebular hypothesis

The history of scientific thought about the formation and evolution of the Solar System began with the Copernican Revolution. The first recorded use of the term "Solar System" dates from 1704. Since the seventeenth century, philosophers and scientists have been forming hypotheses concerning the origins of the Solar System and the Moon and attempting to predict how the Solar System would change in the future. René Descartes was the first to hypothesize on the beginning of the Solar System; however, more scientists joined the discussion in the eighteenth century, forming the groundwork for later hypotheses on the topic. Later, particularly in the twentieth century, a variety of hypotheses began to build up, including the now–commonly accepted nebular hypothesis.

Meanwhile, hypotheses explaining the evolution of the Sun originated in the nineteenth century, especially as scientists began to understand how stars in general functioned. In contrast, hypotheses attempting to explain the origin of the Moon have been circulating for centuries, although all of the widely accepted hypotheses were proven false by the Apollo missions in the mid-twentieth century. Following Apollo, in 1984, the giant impact hypothesis was composed, replacing the already-disproven binary accretion model as the most common explanation for the formation of the Moon.

== Contemporary view ==
The most widely accepted model of planetary formation is known as the nebular hypothesis. This model posits that, 4.6 billion years ago, the Solar System was formed by the gravitational collapse of a giant molecular cloud spanning several light-years. Many stars, including the Sun, were formed within this collapsing cloud. The gas that formed the Solar System was slightly more massive than the Sun itself. Most of the mass concentrated in the center, forming the Sun, and the rest of the mass flattened into a protoplanetary disk, out of which all of the current planets, moons, asteroids, and other celestial bodies in the Solar System formed.

== Formation hypothesis ==
French philosopher and mathematician René Descartes was the first to propose a model for the origin of the Solar System in his book The World, written from 1629 to 1633. In his view, the universe was filled with vortices of swirling particles, and both the Sun and planets had condensed from a large vortex that had contracted, which he thought could explain the circular motion of the planets. However, this was before the knowledge of Newton's theory of gravity, which explains that matter does not behave in this way.

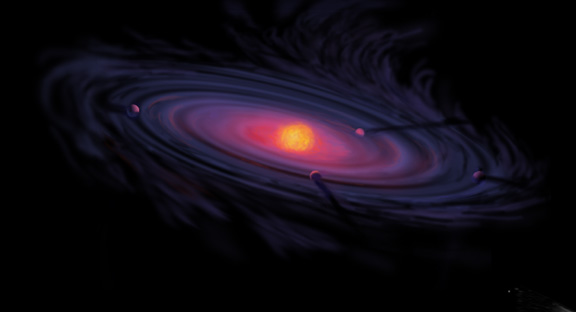
Artist's conception of a protoplanetary disc

The vortex model of 1944, formulated by the German physicist and philosopher Carl Friedrich von Weizsäcker, hearkens back to the Cartesian model by involving a pattern of turbulence-induced eddies in a Laplacian nebular disc. In Weizsäcker's model, a combination of the clockwise rotation of each vortex and the anti-clockwise rotation of the whole system could lead to individual elements moving around the central mass in Keplerian orbits, reducing energy dissipation due to overall motion. However, material would be colliding at a high relative velocity in the inter-vortex boundaries and, in these regions, small roller-bearing eddies would coalesce to give annular condensations. This hypothesis was much criticized, as turbulence is a phenomenon associated with disorder and would not spontaneously produce the highly ordered structure required by the hypothesis. It also does not provide a solution to the angular momentum problem or explain lunar formation and other very basic characteristics of the Solar System.

This model was modified in 1948 by Dutch theoretical physicist Dirk Ter Haar, who hypothesized that regular eddies were discarded and replaced by random turbulence, which would lead to a very thick nebula where gravitational instability would not occur. He concluded the planets must have formed by accretion, and explained the compositional difference between the planets as resulting from the temperature difference between the inner and outer regions, the former being hotter and the latter being cooler, so only refractories (non-volatiles) condensed in the inner region. A major difficulty was that, in this supposition, turbulent dissipation took place over the course of a single millennium, which did not give enough time for planets to form.

The nebular hypothesis was first proposed in 1734 by Swedish scientist Emanuel Swedenborg and later expanded upon by Prussian philosopher Immanuel Kant in 1755. A similar hypothesis was independently formulated by the Frenchman Pierre-Simon Laplace in 1796.

In 1749, Georges-Louis Leclerc, Comte de Buffon conceived the idea that the planets were formed when a comet collided with the Sun, sending matter out to form the planets. However, Pierre-Simon Laplace refuted this idea in 1796, stating that any planets formed in such a way would eventually crash into the Sun. Laplace felt that the near-circular orbits of the planets were a necessary consequence of their formation. Today, comets are known to be far too small to have created the Solar System in this way.

In 1755, Immanuel Kant speculated that observed nebulae could be regions of star and planet formation. In 1796, Laplace elaborated by arguing that the nebula collapsed into a star, and, as it did so, the remaining material gradually spun outward into a flat disc, which then formed planets.

=== Alternative hypotheses ===
However plausible it may appear at first sight, the nebular hypothesis still faces the obstacle of angular momentum; if the Sun had indeed formed from the collapse of such a cloud, the planets should be rotating far more slowly. The Sun, though it contains almost 99.9 percent of the system's mass, contains just 1 percent of its angular momentum, meaning that the Sun should be spinning much more rapidly.

==== Tidal hypothesis ====
Attempts to resolve the angular momentum problem led to the temporary abandonment of the nebular hypothesis in favor of a return to "two-body" hypothesis. For several decades, many astronomers preferred the tidal or near-collision hypothesis put forward by James Jeans in 1917, in which the approach of some other star to the Sun ultimately formed the solar system. This near-miss would have drawn large amounts of matter out of the Sun and the other star by their mutual tidal forces, which could have then condensed into planets. In 1929, astronomer Harold Jeffreys countered that such a near-collision was massively unlikely. American astronomer Henry Norris Russell also objected to the hypothesis by showing that it ran into problems with angular momentum for the outer planets, with the planets struggling to avoid being reabsorbed by the Sun.

==== Chamberlin–Moulton model ====
In 1900, Forest Moulton showed that the nebular hypothesis was inconsistent with observations because of the angular momentum. Moulton and Chamberlin in 1904 originated the planetesimal hypothesis. Along with many astronomers of the time, they came to believe the pictures of "spiral nebulas" from the Lick Observatory were direct evidence of the formation of planetary systems, which later turned out to be galaxies.

Moulton and Chamberlin suggested that a star had passed close to the Sun early in its life, causing tidal bulges, and that this, along with the internal process that leads to solar prominences, resulted in the ejection of filaments of matter from both stars. While most of the material would have fallen back, part of it would remain in orbit. The filaments cooled into numerous, tiny, solid planetesimals and a few larger protoplanets. This model received favorable support for about 3 decades, but passed out of favor by the late '30s and was discarded in the '40s due to the realization it was incompatible with the angular momentum of Jupiter. A part of the hypothesis, planetesimal accretion, was retained.

==== Lyttleton's scenario ====
In 1937 and 1940, Raymond Lyttleton postulated that a companion star to the Sun collided with a passing star. Such a scenario had already been suggested and rejected by Henry Russell in 1935, though it may have been more likely assuming the Sun was born in an open cluster, where stellar collisions are common. Lyttleton showed that terrestrial planets were too small to condense on their own and suggested that one very large proto-planet broke in two because of rotational instability, forming Jupiter and Saturn, with a connecting filament from which the other planets formed. A later model, from 1940 and 1941, involved a triple star system, a binary plus the Sun, in which the binary merged and later split because of rotational instability and escaped from the system, leaving a filament that formed between them to be captured by the Sun. Objections of Lyman Spitzer apply to this model also.

==== Band-structure model ====
In 1954, 1975, and 1978, Swedish astrophysicist Hannes Alfvén included electromagnetic effects in equations of particle motions, and angular momentum distribution and compositional differences were explained. In 1954, he first proposed the band structure, in which he distinguished an A-cloud, containing mostly helium with some solid-particle impurities ("meteor rain"), a B-cloud with mostly carbon, a C-cloud having mainly hydrogen, and a D-cloud made mainly of silicon and iron. Impurities in the A-cloud formed Mars and the Moon (later captured by Earth), impurities in the B-cloud collapsed to form the outer planets, the C-cloud condensed into Mercury, Venus, Earth, the asteroid belt, moons of Jupiter, and Saturn's rings, while Pluto, Triton, the outer satellites of Saturn, the moons of Uranus, the Kuiper Belt, and the Oort cloud formed from the D-cloud.

==== Interstellar cloud hypothesis ====
In 1943, Soviet astronomer Otto Schmidt proposed that the Sun, in its present form, passed through a dense interstellar cloud and emerged enveloped in a cloud of dust and gas, from which the planets eventually formed. This solved the angular momentum problem by assuming that the Sun's slow rotation was peculiar to it and that the planets did not form at the same time as the Sun. Extensions of the model, together forming the Russian school, include Gurevich and Lebedinsky in 1950, Safronov in 1967 and 1969, Ruskol in 1981 Safronov and Vityazeff in 1985, and Safronov and Ruskol in 1994, among others However, this hypothesis was severely dented by Victor Safronov, who showed that the amount of time required to form the planets from such a diffuse envelope would far exceed the Solar System's determined age.

Ray Lyttleton modified the hypothesis by showing that a third body was not necessary and proposing that a mechanism of line accretion, as described by Bondi and Hoyle in 1944, enabled cloud material to be captured by the star (Williams and Cremin, 1968, loc. cit.).

==== Hoyle's hypothesis ====
In Hoyle's 1944 model, the Sun's companion star went nova with ejected material captured by the Sun and planets forming from this material. In a version a year later, it was a supernova. In 1955, he proposed a similar system to Laplace, and again proposed the idea with more mathematical detail in 1960. Hoyle's model differs from Laplace's in that a magnetic torque occurred between the disk and the Sun, which came into effect immediately; otherwise, more and more matter would have been ejected, resulting in a massive planetary system exceeding the size of the existing one and comparable to the Sun. The torque caused a magnetic coupling and acted to transfer angular momentum from the Sun to the disk. The magnetic field strength would have to have been 1 gauss. The existence of torque depended on magnetic lines of force being frozen into the disk, a consequence of a well-known magnetohydrodynamic (MHD) theorem on frozen-in lines of force. As the solar condensation temperature when the disk was ejected could not be much more than 1,000 K (730 °C; 1,340 °F), numerous refractories must have been solid, probably as fine smoke particles, which would have grown with condensation and accretion. These particles would have been swept out with the disk only if their diameter at the Earth's orbit was less than 1 meter, so as the disk moved outward, a subsidiary disk consisting of only refractories remained behind, where the terrestrial planets would form. The model agrees with the mass and composition of the planets and angular momentum distribution provided the magnetic coupling. However, it does not explain twinning, the low mass of Mars and Mercury, and the planetoid belts. Alfvén formulated the concept of frozen-in magnetic field lines.

==== Kuiper's hypothesis ====
Gerard Kuiper in 1944 argued, like Ter Haar, that regular eddies would be impossible and postulated that large gravitational instabilities might occur in the solar nebula, forming condensations. In this, the solar nebula could be either co-genetic with the Sun or captured by it. Density distribution would determine what could form, a planetary system or a stellar companion. The two types of planets were assumed to have resulted from the Roche limit. No explanation was offered for the Sun's slow rotation, which Kuiper saw as a larger G-star problem.

==== Whipple's hypothesis ====
In Fred Whipple's 1948 scenario, a smoke cloud about 60,000 AU in diameter and with 1 solar mass (M_{☉}) contracted and produced the Sun. It had a negligible angular momentum, thus accounting for the Sun's similar property. This smoke cloud captured a smaller one with a large angular momentum. The collapse time for the large smoke and gas nebula is about 100 million years, and the rate was slow at first, increasing in later stages. The planets condensed from small clouds developed in or captured by the second cloud. The orbits would be nearly circular because accretion would reduce eccentricity due to the influence of the resisting medium, and orbital orientations would be similar because of the size of the small cloud and the common direction of the motions. The protoplanets might have heated up to such high degrees that the more volatile compounds would have been lost, and the orbital velocity decreased with increasing distance so that the terrestrial planets would have been more affected. However, this scenario was weak in that practically all the final regularities are introduced as a prior assumption, and quantitative calculations did not support most of the hypothesizing. For these reasons, it did not gain wide acceptance.

==== Urey's model ====
American chemist Harold Urey, who founded cosmochemistry, put forward a scenario in 1951, 1952, 1956, and 1966 based largely on meteorites. His model also used Chandrasekhar's stability equations and obtained density distribution in the gas and dust disk surrounding the primitive Sun. To explain that volatile elements like mercury could be retained by the terrestrial planets, he postulated a moderately thick gas and dust halo shielding the planets from the Sun. To form diamonds, pure carbon crystals, moon-sized objects, and gas spheres that became gravitationally unstable would have to form in the disk, with the gas and dust dissipating at a later stage. Pressure fell as gas was lost and diamonds were converted to graphite, while the gas became illuminated by the Sun. Under these conditions, considerable ionization would be present, and the gas would be accelerated by magnetic fields, hence the angular momentum could be transferred from the Sun. Urey postulated that these lunar-size bodies were destroyed by collisions, with the gas dissipating, leaving behind solids collected at the core, with the resulting smaller fragments pushed far out into space and the larger fragments staying behind and accreting into planets. He suggested the Moon was such a surviving core.

==== Protoplanet hypothesis ====
In 1960, 1963, and 1978, W. H. McCrea proposed the protoplanet hypothesis, in which the Sun and planets individually coalesced from matter within the same cloud, with the smaller planets later captured by the Sun's larger gravity. It includes fission in a protoplanetary nebula and excludes a solar nebula. Agglomerations of floccules, which are presumed to compose the supersonic turbulence assumed to occur in the interstellar material from which stars are born, formed the Sun and protoplanets, the latter splitting to form planets. The two portions could not remain gravitationally bound to each other at a mass ratio of at least 8 to 1, and for inner planets, went into independent orbits, while for outer planets, one portion exited the Solar System. The inner protoplanets were Venus-Mercury and Earth-Mars. The moons of the greater planets were formed from "droplets" in the neck connecting the two portions of the dividing protoplanet. These droplets could account for some asteroids. Terrestrial planets would have no major moons, which does not account for the Moon. The hypothesis also predicts certain observations, such as the similar angular velocity of Mars and Earth with similar rotation periods and axial tilts. In this scheme, there are six principal planets: two terrestrial, Venus and Earth; two major, Jupiter and Saturn; and two outer, Uranus and Neptune, along with three lesser planets: Mercury, Mars, and Pluto.

This hypothesis has some problems, such as failing to explain the fact that the planets all orbit the Sun in the same direction with relatively low eccentricity, which would appear highly unlikely if they were each individually captured.

==== Cameron's hypothesis ====
In American astronomer Alastair G. W. Cameron's hypothesis from 1962 and 1963, the protosun, with a mass of about 1–2 Suns and a diameter of around 100,000 AU, was gravitationally unstable, collapsed, and broke into smaller subunits. The magnetic field was around 1/100,000 gauss. During the collapse, the magnetic lines of force were twisted. The collapse was fast and occurred due to the dissociation of hydrogen molecules, followed by the ionization of hydrogen and the double ionization of helium. Angular momentum led to rotational instability, which produced a Laplacean disk. At this stage, radiation removed excess energy, the disk would cool over a relatively short period of about 1 million years, and the condensation into what Whipple calls cometismals took place. Aggregation of these cometismals produced giant planets, which in turn produced disks during their formation, which evolved into lunar systems. The formation of terrestrial planets, comets, and asteroids involved disintegration, heating, melting, and solidification. Cameron also formulated the giant-impact hypothesis for the origin of the Moon.

==== Capture hypothesis ====
The capture hypothesis, proposed by Michael Mark Woolfson in 1964, posits that the Solar System formed from tidal interactions between the Sun and a low-density protostar. The Sun's gravity would have drawn material from the diffuse atmosphere of the protostar, which would then have collapsed to form the planets.

As captured planets would have initially eccentric orbits, Dormand and Woolfson proposed the possibility of a collision. They hypothesized that a filament was thrown out by a passing protostar and was captured by the Sun, resulting in the formation of planets. In this idea, there were 6 original planets, corresponding to 6 point-masses in the filament, with planets A and B, the two innermost, colliding. A, at 200 Earth masses, was ejected out of the Solar System, while B, estimated to be 25 Earth masses, split into Earth and Venus. Mercury is also a fragment of B. Mars and the Moon are escaped moons of A. Pluto is either a fragment from the collision or a former moon of Neptune sent into a heliocentric orbit by Triton, another of A's former satellites, which formed Charon from tidal disruption of Pluto. The collision also formed the asteroid belt and Oort's cloud.

==== Classification of the hypotheses ====
Jeans, in 1931, divided the various models into two groups: those where the material for planet formation came from the Sun, and those where it did not and may be concurrent or consecutive.

In 1963, William McCrea divided them into another two groups: those that relate the formation of the planets to the formation of the Sun and those where it is independent of the formation of the Sun, where the planets form after the Sun becomes a normal star.

Ter Haar and Cameron distinguished between those hypotheses that consider a closed system, which is a development of the Sun and possibly a solar envelope, that starts with a protosun rather than the Sun itself, and state that Belot calls these hypotheses monistic; and those that consider an open system, which is where there is an interaction between the Sun and some foreign body that is supposed to have been the first step in the developments leading to the planetary system, and state that Belot calls these hypotheses dualistic.

Hervé Reeves' classification also categorized them as co-genetic with the Sun or not, but also considered their formation from altered or unaltered stellar and interstellar material. He also recognized four groups: models based on the solar nebula, originated by Swedenborg, Kant, and Laplace in the 1700s; hypotheses proposing a cloud captured from interstellar space, major proponents being Alfvén and Gustaf Arrhenius in 1978; the binary hypotheses which propose that a sister star somehow disintegrated and a portion of its dissipating material was captured by the Sun, with the principal hypothesizer being Lyttleton in the 1940s; and the close-approach filament ideas of Jeans, Jeffreys, and Woolfson and Dormand.

Iwan P. Williams and Alan William Cremin split the models between two categories: those that regard the origin and formation of the planets as being essentially related to the Sun, with the two formation processes taking place concurrently or consecutively, and those that regard the formation of the planets as being independent of the formation process of the Sun, the planets forming after the Sun becomes a normal star. The latter category has 2 subcategories: models where the material for the formation of the planets is extracted either from the Sun or another star, and models where the material is acquired from interstellar space. They conclude that the best models are Hoyle's magnetic coupling and McCrea's floccules.

Woolfson recognized monistic models, which included Laplace, Descartes, Kant, and Weizsäcker, and dualistic models, which included Buffon, Chamberlin-Moulton, Jeans, Jeffreys, and Schmidt-Lyttleton.

=== Reemergence of the nebular hypothesis ===
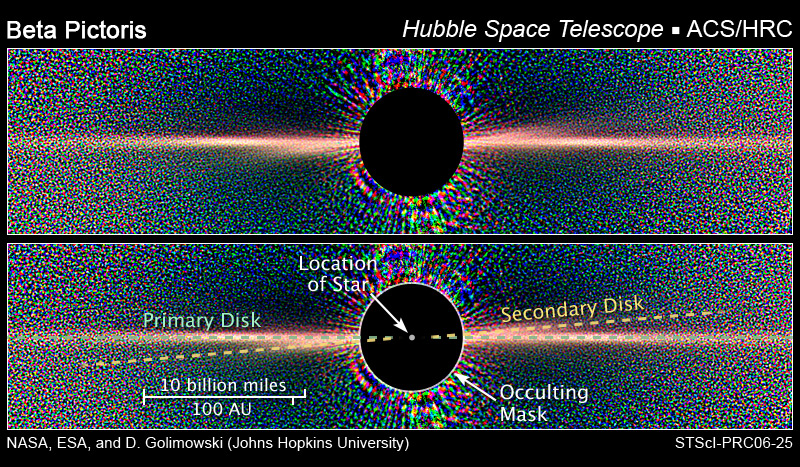
Beta Pictoris as seen by the Hubble Space Telescope

In 1978, astronomer Andrew J. R. Prentice revived the Laplacian nebular model in his Modern Laplacian Theory by suggesting that the angular momentum problem could be resolved by drag created by dust grains in the original disc, which slowed down rotation in the centre. Prentice also suggested that the young Sun transferred some angular momentum to the protoplanetary disc and planetesimals through supersonic ejections understood to occur in T Tauri stars. However, his contention that such formation would occur in toruses or rings has been questioned, as any such rings would disperse before collapsing into planets.

The birth of the modern, widely accepted hypothesis of planetary formation, the Solar Nebular Disk Model (SNDM), can be traced to the works of Soviet astronomer Victor Safronov. His book Evolution of the protoplanetary cloud and formation of the Earth and the planets, which was translated to English in 1972, had a long-lasting effect on how scientists thought about the formation of the planets. In this book, almost all major problems of the planetary formation process were formulated, and some of them were solved. Safronov's ideas were further developed in the works of George Wetherill, who discovered runaway accretion. By the early 1980s, the nebular hypothesis in the form of SNDM had come back into favor, led by two major discoveries in astronomy. First, several young stars, such as Beta Pictoris, were found to be surrounded by discs of cool dust, much as was predicted by the nebular hypothesis. Second, the Infrared Astronomical Satellite, launched in 1983, observed that many stars had an excess of infrared radiation that could be explained if they were orbited by discs of cooler material.

=== Outstanding issues ===
While the broad picture of the nebular hypothesis is widely accepted, many of the details are not well understood and continue to be refined.

The refined nebular model was developed entirely on observations of the Solar System because it was the only one known until the mid-1990s. It was not confidently assumed to be widely applicable to other planetary systems, although scientists were anxious to test the nebular model by finding protoplanetary discs or even planets around other stars. As of August 30, 2013, the discovery of 941 extrasolar planets has turned up many surprises, and the nebular model must be revised to account for these discovered planetary systems, or new models considered.

Among the extrasolar planets discovered to date are planets the size of Jupiter or larger, but that possess very short orbital periods of only a few hours. Such planets would have to orbit very closely to their stars, so closely that their atmospheres would be gradually stripped away by solar radiation. There is no consensus on how to explain these so-called hot Jupiters, but one leading idea is that of planetary migration, similar to the process which is thought to have moved Uranus and Neptune to their current, distant orbit. Possible processes that cause the migration include orbital friction while the protoplanetary disk is still full of hydrogen and helium gas and exchange of angular momentum between giant planets and the particles in the protoplanetary disc.

One other problem is the detailed features of the planets. The solar nebula hypothesis predicts that all planets will form exactly in the ecliptic plane. Instead, the orbits of the classical planets have various small inclinations with respect to the ecliptic. Furthermore, for the gas giants, it is predicted that their rotations and moon systems will not be inclined with respect to the ecliptic plane. However, most gas giants have substantial axial tilts with respect to the ecliptic, with Uranus having a 98° tilt. The Moon being relatively large with respect to the Earth and other moons in irregular orbits with respect to their planet is yet another issue. It is now believed these observations are explained by events that happened after the initial formation of the Solar System.

== Solar evolution hypotheses ==
Attempts to isolate the physical source of the Sun's energy, and thus determine when and how it might ultimately run out, began in the 19th century.

=== Kelvin–Helmholtz contraction ===
In the 19th century, the prevailing scientific view on the source of the Sun's heat was that it was generated by gravitational contraction. In the 1840s, astronomers J. R. Mayer and J. J. Waterson first proposed that the Sun's massive weight would cause it to collapse in on itself, generating heat. Both Hermann von Helmholtz and Lord Kelvin expounded upon this idea in 1854, suggesting that heat may also be produced by the impact of meteors on the Sun's surface. Theories at the time suggested that stars evolved moving down the main sequence of the Hertzsprung–Russell diagram, starting as diffuse red supergiants before contracting and heating to become blue main-sequence stars, then even further down to red dwarfs before finally ending up as cool, dense black dwarfs. However, the Sun only has enough gravitational potential energy to power its luminosity by this mechanism for about 30 million years—far less than the age of the Earth. (This collapse time is known as the Kelvin–Helmholtz timescale.)

Albert Einstein's development of the theory of relativity in 1905 led to the understanding that nuclear reactions could create new elements from smaller precursors with the loss of energy. In his treatise Stars and Atoms, Arthur Eddington suggested that pressures and temperatures within stars were great enough for hydrogen nuclei to fuse into helium, a process which could produce the massive amounts of energy required to power the Sun. In 1935, Eddington went further and suggested that other elements might also form within stars. Spectral evidence collected after 1945 showed that the distribution of the commonest chemical elements, such as carbon, hydrogen, oxygen, nitrogen, neon, and iron, was fairly uniform across the galaxy, suggesting that these elements had a common origin. Numerous anomalies in the proportions hinted at an underlying mechanism for creation. For example, lead has a higher atomic weight than gold, but is far more common; besides, hydrogen and helium (elements 1 and 2) are virtually ubiquitous, yet lithium and beryllium (elements 3 and 4) are extremely rare.

=== Red giants ===
While the unusual spectra of red giant stars had been known since the 19th century, it was George Gamow who, in the 1940s, first understood that they were stars of roughly solar mass that had run out of hydrogen in their cores and had resorted to burning the hydrogen in their outer shells. This allowed Martin Schwarzschild to draw the connection between red giants and the finite lifespans of stars. It is now understood that red giants are stars in the last stages of their life cycles.

Fred Hoyle noted that, even while the distribution of elements was fairly uniform, different stars had varying amounts of each element. To Hoyle, this indicated that they must have originated within the stars themselves. The abundance of elements peaked around the atomic number for iron, an element that could only have been formed under intense pressures and temperatures. Hoyle concluded that iron must have formed within giant stars. From this, in 1945 and 1946, Hoyle constructed the final stages of a star's life cycle. As the star dies, it collapses under its weight, leading to a stratified chain of fusion reactions: carbon-12 fuses with helium to form oxygen-16, oxygen-16 fuses with helium to produce neon-20, and so on up to iron. There was, however, no known method by which carbon-12 could be produced. Isotopes of beryllium produced via fusion were too unstable to form carbon, and for three helium atoms to form carbon-12 was so unlikely as to have been impossible over the age of the Universe. However, in 1952, physicist Ed Salpeter showed that a short enough time existed between the formation and the decay of the beryllium isotope that another helium had a small chance to form carbon, but only if their combined mass/energy amounts were equal to that of carbon-12. Hoyle, employing the anthropic principle, showed that it must be so, since he himself was made of carbon, and he existed. When the matter/energy level of carbon-12 was finally determined, it was found to be within a few percent of Hoyle's prediction.

=== White dwarfs ===
The first white dwarf discovered was in the triple star system of 40 Eridani, which contains the relatively bright main sequence star 40 Eridani A, orbited at a distance by the closer binary system of the white dwarf 40 Eridani B and the main sequence red dwarf 40 Eridani C. The pair 40 Eridani B/C was discovered by William Herschel on January 31, 1783;^{, p. 73} it was again observed by Friedrich Georg Wilhelm Struve in 1825 and by Otto Wilhelm von Struve in 1851. In 1910, Henry Norris Russell, Edward Charles Pickering, and Williamina Fleming discovered that, despite being a dim star, 40 Eridani B was of spectral type A, or white.

White dwarfs were found to be extremely dense soon after their discovery. If a star is in a binary system, as is the case for Sirius B and 40 Eridani B, it is possible to estimate its mass from observations of the binary orbit. This was done for Sirius B by 1910, yielding a mass estimate of 0.94 M_{☉} (a more modern estimate being 1.00 M_{☉}). Since hotter bodies radiate more than colder ones, a star's surface brightness can be estimated from its effective surface temperature, and hence from its spectrum. If the star's distance is known, its overall luminosity can also be estimated. A comparison of the two figures yields the star's radius. Reasoning of this sort led to the realization, puzzling to astronomers at the time, that Sirius B and 40 Eridani B must be very dense. For example, when Ernst Öpik estimated the density of some visual binary stars in 1916, he found that 40 Eridani B had a density of over 25,000 times the Sun's, which was so high that he called it "impossible".

Such densities are possible because white dwarf material is not composed of atoms bound by chemical bonds, but rather consists of a plasma of unbound nuclei and electrons. There is therefore no obstacle to placing nuclei closer to each other than electron orbitals—the regions occupied by electrons bound to an atom—would normally allow. Eddington, however, wondered what would happen when this plasma cooled and the energy which kept the atoms ionized was no longer present. This paradox was resolved by R. H. Fowler in 1926 by an application of newly devised quantum mechanics. Since electrons obey the Pauli exclusion principle, no two electrons can occupy the same state, and they must obey Fermi–Dirac statistics, also introduced in 1926 to determine the statistical distribution of particles that satisfies the Pauli exclusion principle. At zero temperature, therefore, electrons could not all occupy the lowest-energy, or ground, state; some of them had to occupy higher-energy states, forming a band of lowest-available energy states, the Fermi sea. This state of the electrons, called degenerate, meant that a white dwarf could cool to zero temperature and still possess high energy.

=== Planetary nebulae ===
Planetary nebulae are generally faint objects, and none are visible to the naked eye. The first planetary nebula discovered was the Dumbbell Nebula in the constellation of Vulpecula, observed by Charles Messier in 1764 and listed as M27 in his catalogue of nebulous objects. To early observers with low-resolution telescopes, M27 and subsequently discovered planetary nebulae somewhat resembled the gas giants, and William Herschel, the discoverer of Uranus, eventually coined the term 'planetary nebula' for them, although, as we now know, they are very different from planets.

The central stars of planetary nebulae are very hot. Their luminosity, though, is very low, implying that they must be very small. A star can collapse to such a small size only once it has exhausted all its nuclear fuel, so planetary nebulae came to be understood as a final stage of stellar evolution. Spectroscopic observations show that all planetary nebulae are expanding, and so the idea arose that planetary nebulae were caused by a star's outer layers being thrown into space at the end of its life.

== Lunar origins hypotheses ==
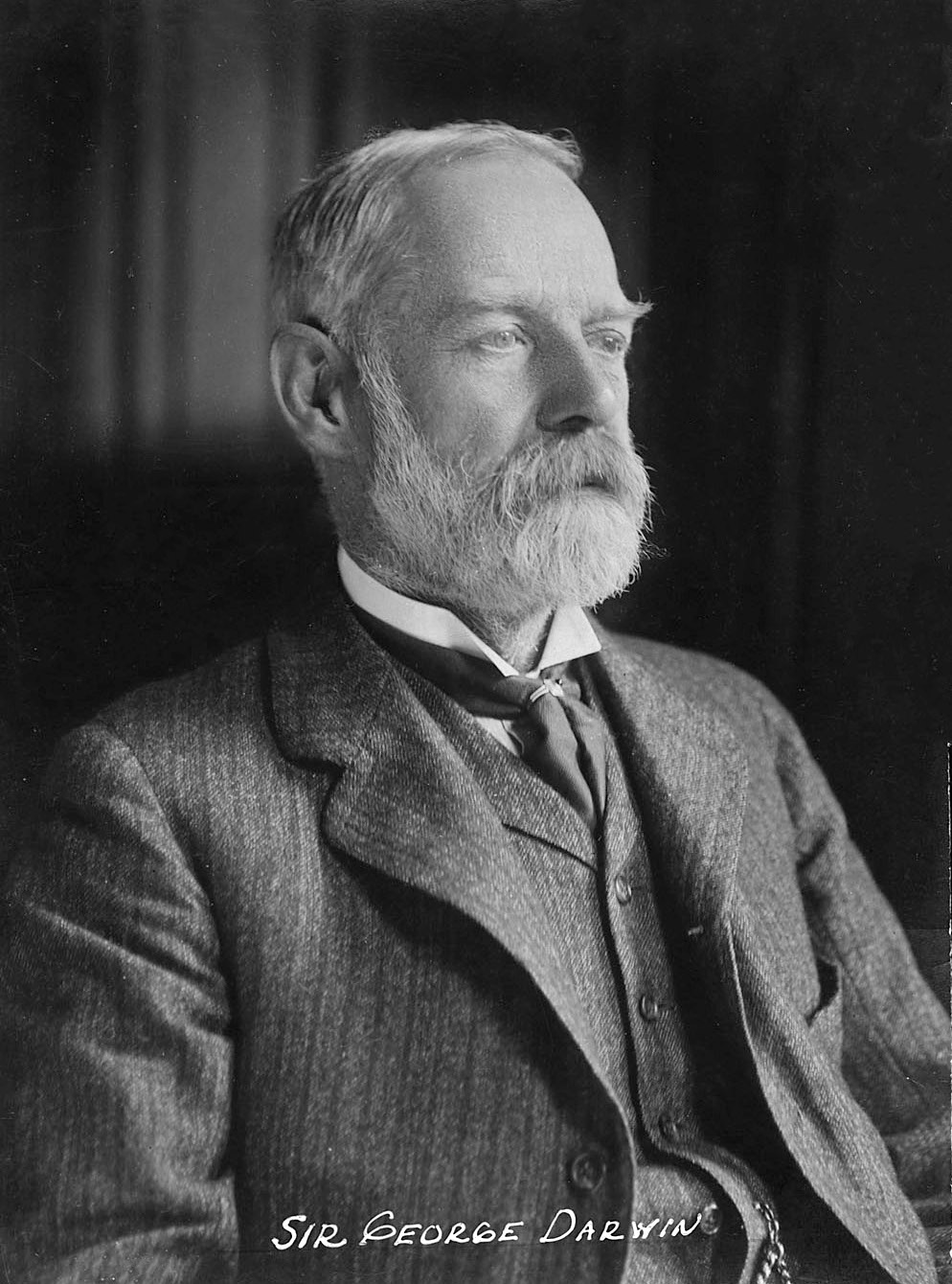
George Darwin

Over the centuries, many scientific hypotheses have been put forward concerning the origin of Earth's Moon. One of the earliest was the so-called binary accretion model, which concluded that the Moon accreted from material in orbit around the Earth leftover from its formation. Another, the fission model, was developed by George Darwin (son of Charles Darwin), who noted that, as the Moon is gradually receding from the Earth at a rate of about 4 cm per year, so at one point in the distant past, it must have been part of the Earth but was flung outward by the momentum of Earth's then–much faster rotation. This hypothesis is also supported by the fact that the Moon's density, while less than Earth's, is about equal to that of Earth's rocky mantle, suggesting that, unlike the Earth, it lacks a dense iron core. A third hypothesis, known as the capture model, suggested that the Moon was an independently orbiting body that had been snared into orbit by Earth's gravity.

=== Apollo missions ===
The existing hypotheses were all refuted by the Apollo lunar missions in the late 1960s and early 1970s, which introduced a stream of new scientific evidence, specifically concerning the Moon's composition, age, and history. These lines of evidence contradict many predictions made by these earlier models. The rocks brought back from the Moon showed a marked decrease in water relative to rocks elsewhere in the Solar System and evidence of an ocean of magma early in its history, indicating that its formation must have produced a great deal of energy. Also, oxygen isotopes in lunar rocks showed a marked similarity to those on Earth, suggesting that they formed at a similar location in the solar nebula. The capture model fails to explain the similarity in these isotopes (if the Moon had originated in another part of the Solar System, those isotopes would have been different), while the co-accretion model cannot adequately explain the loss of water (if the Moon formed similarly to the Earth, the amount of water trapped in its mineral structure would also be roughly similar). Conversely, the fission model, while it can account for the similarity in chemical composition and the lack of iron in the Moon, cannot adequately explain its high orbital inclination and, in particular, the large amount of angular momentum in the Earth–Moon system, more than any other planet–satellite pair in the Solar System.

=== Giant impact hypothesis ===
For many years after Apollo, the binary accretion model was settled on as the best hypothesis for explaining the Moon's origins, even though it was known to be flawed. Then, at a conference in Kona, Hawaii in 1984, a compromise model was composed that accounted for all of the observed discrepancies. Originally formulated by two independent research groups in 1976, the giant impact model supposed that a massive planetary object the size of Mars had collided with Earth early in its history. The impact would have melted Earth's crust, and the other planet's heavy core would have sunk inward and merged with Earth's. The superheated vapor produced by the impact would have risen into orbit around the planet, coalescing into the Moon. This explained the lack of water, as the vapor cloud was too hot for water to condense; the similarity in composition, since the Moon had formed from part of the Earth; the lower density, since the Moon had formed from the Earth's crust and mantle, rather than its core; and the Moon's unusual orbit, since an oblique strike would have imparted a massive amount of angular momentum to the Earth–Moon system.

==== Outstanding issues ====
The giant impact model has been criticized for being too explanatory, since it can be expanded to explain any future discoveries and, as such, is unfalsifiable. Many also claim that much of the material from the impactor would have ended up in the Moon, meaning that the isotope levels would be different, but they are not. In addition, while some volatile compounds such as water are absent from the Moon's crust, many others, such as manganese, are not.

=== Other natural satellites ===
While the co-accretion and capture models are not currently accepted as valid explanations for the existence of the Moon, they have been employed to explain the formation of other natural satellites in the Solar System. Jupiter's Galilean satellites are believed to have formed via co-accretion, while the Solar System's irregular satellites, such as Triton, are all believed to have been captured.
