= Bondi–Hoyle–Lyttleton accretion =

Model for the accretion of a uniform gas by a massive body

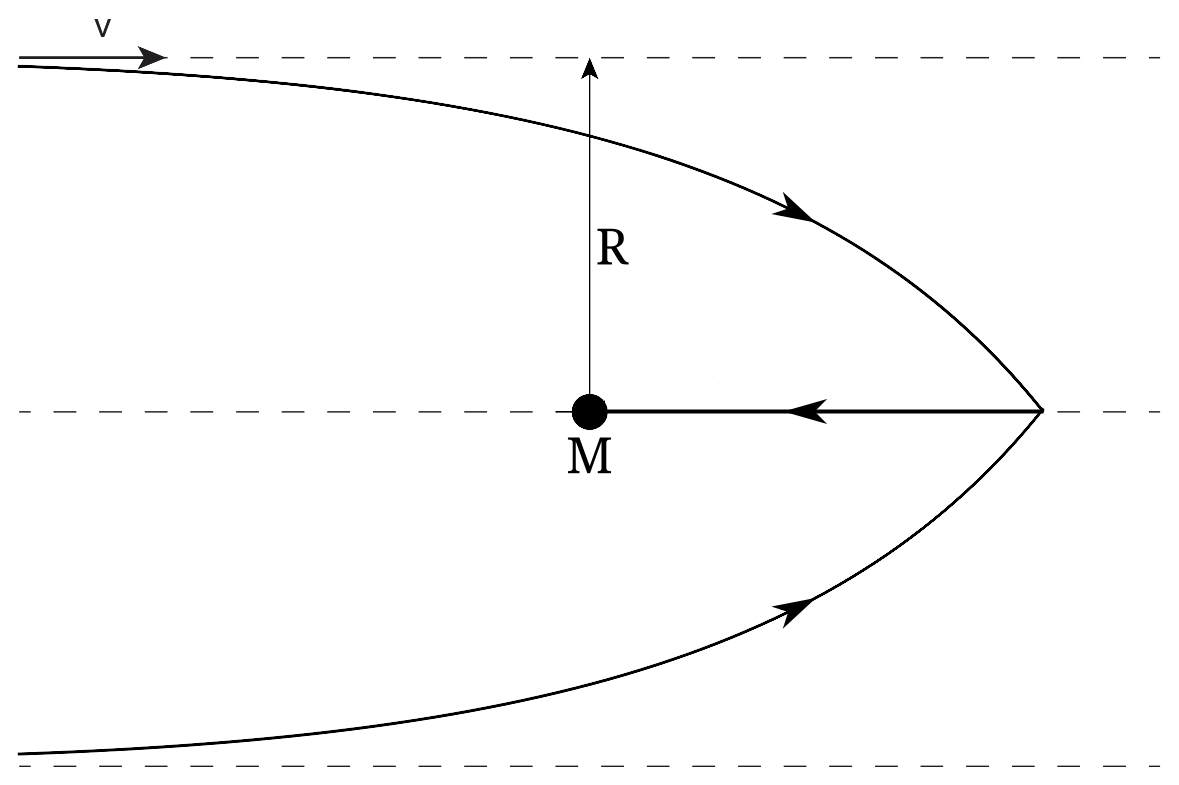
Illustration of BHL accretion around a body with mass M . The particle flow has an initial velocity of v . The particle's path starts at a radial distance R from the accreted body. Adapted from ref..

Bondi–Hoyle–Lyttleton (BHL) accretion (also known as Bondi–Hoyle accretion) is a mathematical model for the accretion of a uniform gas by a massive body. It is a general model of accretion with multiple applications, such as accretion of the interstellar medium by neutron stars and black holes, or wind mass transfer in binary star systems.

It is named after Hermann Bondi, Fred Hoyle, and Raymond Lyttleton. An initial estimate of the accretion rate for a supersonic wind was derived by Hoyle and Lyttleton in 1939 to explain variations in the climate of the Earth. The generally accepted form of BHL accretion was derived by Bondi, who combined an improved version the earlier work with his own work on spherically symmetric accretion (known as Bondi accretion).

== Accretion rate ==
The accretion rate (the amount of mass accreted per unit of time) of the BHL formalism is given by

$$\dot M = \alpha \frac{2\pi(GM)^2\rho}{(v^2+c^2)^{3/2}},$$

where

- $\rho$ is the density of the gas;
- $v$ is the relative velocity between the gas and the accreting body;
- $M$ is the mass of the accreting body;
- $c$ is the speed of sound in the gas;
- $\alpha$ is a dimensionless factor between 1 and 2, which cannot be determined analytically.

== History ==
In a 1939 paper, Fred Hoyle and Raymond Lyttleton considered the possibility that variations in the Earth's climate might be caused by the accretion of the interstellar medium (ISM) by the Sun. They proposed that when the Solar System moves through a cloud in the ISM, the Sun would accrete material from it, and created a model to mathematically explain this accretion rate. This would release the gravitational potential energy of the accreted material as radiation, which would increase the Earth's temperature. They claimed that this variation could be large enough to explain the occurrence of ice ages and the increase in radiation needed to explain the occurrence of the carboniferous.

Hoyle worked with Hermann Bondi to refine the model devised in Hoyle's earlier paper. This 1944 paper improved the model by considering some limited pressure effects, and used it to analyse the peculiar velocities of stars in the galaxy. They found that the accretion of the ISM gives a drag-like effect, giving rise to a tendency for the peculiar velocities to decrease over time.

The paper which completed the modern-day formulation of the BHL mechanism was published in 1952, where Bondi considered an accretor that unmoving with respect to the ISM, in contrast to the supersonically moving accretor considered by Hoyle, a model known as Bondi accretion. He also proposed an interpolation formula for the intermediate case of an accretor travelling with a velocity comparable to the speed of sound, which is the formula that is most commonly used.

=== Climate variations ===
After the publication of Hoyle and Lyttleton's original paper, their theory to explain the earth's climatic variations was seriously considered in the literature. For decades, it competed with many other theories to explain this phenomenon. In 2008, a review article found that there is no evidence that the motion of the Sun plays a significant role in climatic variations.

=== Astrophysical applications ===
Besides the application to the Earth's climate, the BHL model was also used in astrophysics, as in the paper by Bondi and Hoyle. Other applications of the model to astrophysics include the accretion of material by neutron stars and black holes, the accretion of material from the intergalactic medium, and the accretion of the stellar wind in binary star systems. Notably, the last application was used to show that barium stars can be created through this mechanism.

== Derivation of Hoyle–Lyttleton accretion ==
Hoyle–Lyttleton accretion is a simplified (Note: BHL accretion was derived later than Hoyle–Lyttleton accretion, with the former building upon the latter.) version of BHL accretion which treats the gas as being supersonic.

Hoyle–Lyttleton accretion assumes a homogeneous flow of incoming particles traveling with a (supersonic) velocity $v$ with density $\rho$ towards an accreting body with mass $M$. The particles flow around the massive body, by which they are deflected towards the accretion line that lies behind it. At the accretion line, the particles collide, which cancels their momenta in the radial direction.

Depending on the initial velocity $v$ and the radial distance from the massive body $R$, a particle may either be gravitationally bound to the body or not. A bound particle will then be accreted, while an unbound particle will escape. The initial velocity needed to escape from the massive body is given by its escape velocity at the distance $R$. Thus, the condition for a particle to be accreted is

$$v<\sqrt{\frac{2GM}{R}}.$$

This equation can also be written in terms of an accretion radius $R_\text{acc}$. Thus, all particles that pass through a circle of this radius $R_\text{acc}$ around the massive body are accreted. This gives an accretion rate of

$$\dot M = \pi \rho v R_\text{acc}^2 = \frac{4 \pi (GM)^2 \rho}{v^3}.$$

When taking into account some limited pressure effects and combining the resulting formula with Bondi accretion through an interpolation formula, the canonical formula for the BHL accretion rate can be found.

== Application to binary star systems ==
BHL accretion is used to model mass transfer in binary star systems, such as barium stars. For this, the velocity of the incoming flow is set to the relative velocity between the stellar wind and the accreting star (whose mass is $M_\text{acc}$) around the donor star (whose mass is $M_\text{donor}$), which is thus given by

$$v=\sqrt{v_w^2+v_\text{orb}^2},$$

where

- $v_w$ is the velocity of the stellar wind;
- $v_\text{orb}=\sqrt{G\frac{M_\text{donor}+M_\text{acc}}{a}}$ is the mean orbital velocity, where $a$ is the semimajor axis of the orbit.

Assuming that the stellar wind is emitted in a spherically symmetric way, it can be described by

$$\dot M_\text{donor}=4\pi v_w \rho(r)r^2,$$

where

- $r$ is the distance from the donor star;
- $\rho(r)$ is the mass density of the stellar wind at distance $r$.

Substituting these relations into the equation for the accretion rate, the accreted mass (per unit time) is given by

$$\dot M_\text{acc} = -\alpha\frac{1}{2a^2\sqrt{1-e^2}}\left[\frac{GM_\text{acc}}{v_w}\right]^2 \left[\frac{1}{1+(\frac{v_\text{orb}}{v_w})^2}\right]^{3/2}\dot M_\text{donor},$$

where $e$ is the eccentricity of the orbit and where the $r^2$ was replaced by its average value $a^2\sqrt{1-e^2}$ during the orbit.

== Accuracy ==
Various hydrodynamical simulations of the process considered by BHL accretion have been conducted. These find that while the accretion line only exists temporarily, the values predicted by the BHL formalism agree fairly well with the numerical simulations; to within 10–20%.

=== Binary star systems ===
The BHL formalism is technically only applicable when the wind velocity is much larger than the orbital velocity. For the common scenario of systems containing a giant star, this is typically not the case. Instead, the wind velocity and the orbital velocity are often on the same order of magnitude.

Indeed, hydrodynamical simulations of the accretion process show both qualitative differences in the morphology of the flow, as well as quantitative differences in the predicted efficiency of the mass transfer. In particular, the BHL formalism tends to overpredict the efficiency of the mass transfer in cases where the wind velocity is lower than the orbital velocity. Various adjustments to the BHL formalism that remedy this issue have been proposed, such as a geometric correction factor.

=== Sub-BHL accretion ===
In some astrophysical applications, the accretion rate can be lower than the ideal Bondi-Hoyle-Lyttleton value. It occurs when the accretor is not embedded in a smooth, homogeneous, steady upstream flow, as assumed in the classical formulation, but instead interacts with a structured or time-dependent medium. In colliding-wind binary systems, for example, the wind of the accreting star may oppose the incoming wind, while shocks, radiative cooling, orbital motion, angular momentum, and hydrodynamic instabilities can reduce the fraction of gravitationally focused gas that is actually captured. Numerical simulations of massive colliding-wind binaries have found such a regime between a non-accreting wind-collision state and a more continuous BHL-like accretion state, with accretion occurring intermittently through dense clumps and with rates below the classical BHL estimate.
