= Hermann Bondi =

Austrian-British mathematician and cosmologist (1919–2005)

Sir Hermann Bondi
- Born: 1 November 1919; Vienna, Austria
- Died: 10 September 2005 (aged 85); Cambridge, England, UK
- Citizenship: British
- Education: Trinity College, Cambridge (M.A., 1940)
- Known for: Steady State theory Sticky bead argument Bondi accretion Bondi–Hoyle–Lyttleton accretion Bondi k-calculus Bondi mass Bondi–Metzner–Sachs group Lemaître–Tolman–Bondi metric Atheism
- Awards: Gold Medal of the RAS (2001); Gold Medal of the IMA (1988); Albert Einstein Medal (1983); Guthrie Medal (1973); James Scott Prize Lectureship (1960–1963); Order of the Bath (1973); Fellow of the Royal Society (1959)
- Scientific career
- Fields: Mathematics; Physical cosmology
- Workplaces: King's College London; University of Cambridge
- Academic advisors: Harold Jeffreys; Arthur Eddington
- Doctoral students: Felix Pirani; Roger Tayler

3rd Master of Churchill College, Cambridge
- In office 1983–1990
- Preceded by: Sir William Hawthorne
- Succeeded by: Lord Broers

Sir Hermann Bondi KCB FRS (1 November 1919 – 10 September 2005) was an Austrian-British mathematician and cosmologist.

He is best known for developing the steady state model of the universe with Fred Hoyle and Thomas Gold as an alternative to the Big Bang theory. He contributed to the theory of general relativity, and was the first to analyze the inertial and gravitational interaction of negative mass and the first to explicate correctly the nature of gravitational waves. In his 1990 autobiography, Bondi regarded the 1962 work on gravitational waves as his "best scientific work".

== Early life ==
Bondi was born in Vienna, the son of a Jewish medical doctor. He was brought up in Vienna, where he studied at the Realgymnasium. He showed early prodigious ability at mathematics, and was recommended to Arthur Eddington by Abraham Fraenkel. Fraenkel was a distant relation, the only mathematician in the extended family and Hermann's mother had the foresight to arrange a meeting between her young son and the famous man knowing that this might be the key to enabling him to follow his wishes and become a mathematician himself. Eddington encouraged him to travel to England to read the mathematical tripos at Trinity College, Cambridge. He arrived in Cambridge in 1937, escaping from antisemitism in Austria. Realizing the perilous position of his parents in 1938, shortly before the Anschluss, he sent them a telegram telling them to leave Austria at once. They managed to reach Switzerland and subsequently settled in New York.

In the early years of World War II, he was interned on the Isle of Man and in Canada as a friendly enemy alien. Other internees included Thomas Gold and Max Perutz. In 1940, Bondi became Senior Wrangler at the University of Cambridge. Bondi and Gold were released from internment by the end of 1941, and worked with Fred Hoyle on radar at the Admiralty Signals Establishment. He became a British subject in 1946.

== Career ==
Bondi lectured in mathematics in the University of Cambridge from 1945 to 1954. He was a fellow of Trinity College from 1943 to 1949 and from 1952 to 1954.

In 1948, Hermann Bondi, Fred Hoyle and Thomas Gold formulated the Steady State theory, which holds that the universe is constantly expanding but matter is constantly created to form new stars and galaxies to maintain a constant average density. Steady State theory was eclipsed by the rival Big Bang theory with the discovery of the cosmic microwave background (CMB).

Bondi was one of the first to correctly appreciate the nature of gravitational radiation, introducing Bondi radiation coordinates, the Bondi k-calculus, the notions of Bondi mass and Bondi news, and writing review articles. He popularized the sticky bead argument which was said to be originally due, anonymously, to Richard Feynman, for the claim that physically meaningful gravitational radiation is indeed predicted by general relativity, an assertion which was controversial up until about 1955. A 1947 paper revived interest in the Lemaître–Tolman metric, an inhomogeneous, spherically symmetric dust solution (often called the LTB or Lemaître–Tolman–Bondi metric). Bondi also contributed to the theory of accretion of matter from a cloud of gas onto a star or a black hole, working with Raymond Lyttleton and giving his name to "Bondi accretion" and the "Bondi radius".

He became a professor in King's College London in 1954 and was appointed Emeritus Professor there in 1985. He was secretary of the Royal Astronomical Society from 1956 to 1964.

== Other work ==
Bondi was also active outside the confines of academic lecturing and research. He held many positions:

- Director-General of the European Space Research Organisation (ESRO) (1967–1971) (which later became the European Space Agency, ESA)
- Chief Scientific Adviser to the Ministry of Defence (1971–1977)
- Chief Scientific Adviser to the Department of Energy (1977–1980)
- Chairman of the Natural Environment Research Council (NERC) (1980–1984)
- President of the Society for Research into Higher Education (1981–1997)
- President of the Hydrographic Society (1985–1987)
- Master of Churchill College, Cambridge (1983–1990).

He became a fellow of the Royal Society in 1959. He made a series of television programs called E=mc^{2} for the BBC in 1963. He was appointed a Knight Commander of the Bath in 1973. He was awarded the Einstein Society Gold Medal in 1983, the Gold Medal of the Institute of Mathematics and its Applications in 1988, the G.D. Birla International Award for Humanism, and the Gold Medal of the Royal Astronomical Society in 2001. He was awarded an Honorary Degree (Doctor of Science) by the University of Bath in 1974.

His report into the flooding of London in 1953 led eventually to the building of the Thames Barrier. He also supported the proposal for a Severn Barrage to generate electricity, but this project was not carried forward.

His papers from 1940 to 2000 are archived in 109 archive boxes by the Janus Project.

== Personal life ==
His parents were Jewish, but he never "felt the need for religion" and was a lifelong humanist. He was president of the British Humanist Association from 1982 to 1999, and president of the Rationalist Press Association from 1982. He was one of the signers of the Humanist Manifesto.

He married Christine Stockman, also a mathematician and astronomer, in 1947; she had been one of Hoyle's research students and like him she went on to be active in the humanist movement. Together, they had two sons and three daughters, one of whom is Professor Liz Bondi, feminist geographer at the University of Edinburgh. He died at Cambridge in 2005, aged 85 and his ashes were scattered at Anglesey Abbey near Cambridge. Christine died in 2015.

== References and notes ==
Academic offices
| Preceded by Sir William Hawthorne | Master of Churchill College; 1983–1990 | Succeeded by Lord Alec Broers |
