= Source function =

The source function is a characteristic of a stellar atmosphere, and in the case of no scattering of photons, describes the ratio of the emission coefficient to the absorption coefficient. It is a measure of how photons in a light beam are removed and replaced by new photons by the material it passes through. Its units in the cgs-system are erg s^{−1} cm^{−2} sr^{−1} Hz^{−1} and in SI are W m^{−2} sr^{−1} Hz^{−1} . The source function can be written

$$S_{\lambda} \ \stackrel{\mathrm{def}}{=}\   \frac{j_{\lambda}}{\kappa_{\lambda}}$$

where $j_{\lambda}$ is the emission coefficient, $\kappa_{\lambda}$ is the absorption coefficient (also known as the opacity). Putting this into the equation for radiative transfer we get

$$-\frac{1}{\kappa_{\lambda} \rho} \frac{dI_{\lambda}}{ds} = I_{\lambda} - S_{\lambda}$$

where s is the distance measured along the path traveled by the beam. The minus sign on the left hand side shows that the intensity decreases as the beam travels, due to the absorption of photons.

== See also ==
- Radiative transfer
- Opacity (optics)
