= Solomon Mestel =

Solomon Mestel (1886 – 21 September 1966) was an Australian rabbi.

Born in Brody, Galicia (now Ukraine), he migrated to England in 1908. He passed London University matriculation in 1911, and was awarded a BA in Hebrew and Aramaic in 1914, and an MA in 1919. Also in 1919, he married Rachel Brodetsky, sister of Selig Brodetsky, and began working as a minister of religion.

He migrated to Melbourne, Australia in 1923, where his son Leon Mestel was born. He became minister of East Melbourne synagogue and was awarded semicha in 1926. He was an active Freemason. He was a leading supporter of the efforts in the late 1920s by the Judean league "to uphold traditional Judaism" against people who wanted to play sport on Sabbath.

He returned to London in 1930 and was rabbi at Forest Gate until his retirement in 1951. After retirement, he translated several Hebrew legal texts into English. He died in Essex on 21 September 1966.

== Sources ==
- Mestel, Leon (2012), "Family background", Astronomy & Geophysics vol.53, page 5.18
