= Gerald James Whitrow =

British mathematician and historian of science

G.J. Whitrow sketch by Patrick L. Gallegos

Gerald James Whitrow (9 June 1912 – 2 June 2000) was a British mathematician, cosmologist and science historian.

== Biography ==
Whitrow was born on 9 June 1912 at Kimmeridge in Dorset, the elder son of William and Emily (née Watkins) Whitrow.

After completing school at Christ's Hospital, he obtained a scholarship at Christ Church, Oxford in 1930, earning his first degree in 1933; he was a Harmsworth Senior Scholar at Merton College, Oxford, from 1935 to 1937, taking his MA in 1937, and was awarded his PhD in 1939. At Oxford he worked on an alternative theory of relativity with Professor Edward Arthur Milne. During World War II, he worked as a scientific officer for the Ministry of Supply. His work was on defence research, including ballistics, and he worked at Fort Halstead (near Sevenoaks) and Cambridge. After the war, he taught at the Imperial College, London, first as a lecturer, then as reader of applied mathematics (1951), and as professor of the history of mathematics in 1972.

In 1955, Whitrow investigated the possibility of extradimensional space in "Why Physical Space Has Three Dimensions." He argued that if space has four dimensions and the laws of gravitation and electromagnetism remain unchanged, the inverse square law would be transformed into an inverse cube law, leading to unstable planetary orbits and atomic structures. These instabilities would worsen for dimensions larger than four. If spatial dimensions were reduced to two, the propagation and reflection of waves would be more difficult, which would reduce coherent behavior of complex systems. He concluded that life would not be possible in other than three space dimensions.

Following his 1979 retirement, he was emeritus professor and senior research fellow of the Imperial College. For much of his life he was a Fellow of the Royal Astronomical Society, to which he made an extraordinary contribution by reorganizing its important library and archives when he became chairman of the library committee in the early 1960s, a position he held until 1975. In 1971 he was the founding President of the British Society for the History of Mathematics. Whitrow was also an early member of the British Society for the History of Science, serving as its President between 1968 and 1970.

Whitrow's interest in libraries and archives extended to the Athenaeum Club, of which he was elected a member in 1957. He served two terms on the club's library committee and was its chairman between 1979 and 1981. He was responsible for founding some of the various discussion groups that exist in the club, and in the early 1990s he served on its executive committee.

His main contributions were in the fields of cosmology and astrophysics, but his interests included the history and philosophy of science, with a particular focus on the concept of time. Among his publications, The Natural Philosophy of Time received special attention. His work placed him at the centre of the study of time and this led, in 1966, to his becoming the first president of the newly founded International Society for the Study of Time.

Whitrow published an important paper on the cosmic background radiation (relic of the Primordial Fireball) with B. D. Yallop in 1964:

Title: The background radiation in homogeneous isotropic world models, I. Authors: Whitrow, G. J. & Yallop, B. D. Journal: Monthly Notices of the Royal Astronomical Society, Vol. 127, p. 301 Bibliographic Code: 1964 MNRAS.127..301W

Whitrow died on 2 June 2000 and, following a private funeral, his ashes were scattered on Christ Church Meadow. The Royal Astronomical Society awards a biennial lectureship in his name.

== Bibliography ==
Books:

- The Structure and Evolution of the Universe: An Introduction to Cosmology, 1949; London: Hutchinson, 1959.
- (with G.O. Jones and J. Rotblat): Atoms and the Universe, 1956; Penguin Books, 1973.
- The Structure and Evolution of the Universe, 1959.
- (with Hermann Bondi, W. B. Bonnor and R. A. Lyttleton): Rival Theories of Cosmology, 1960.
- The Natural Philosophy of Time, 1960; Oxford Univ. Press, 1980.
- What is Time?, 1972.
- The Nature of Time, Holt, Rinehart and Winston, 1975.
- Einstein, the Man and his Achievement, Dover, 1986.
- Time in History, Oxford University Press, 1988.

Articles:

- 1967, "Reflections on the Natural Philosophy of Time", in: Annals of the New York Academy of Sciences 138: 422–32.
- 1973, "Time and Measurement", in: Dictionary of the History of Ideas.
- 1979, "Mathematical Time and Its Role in the Development of the Scientific World-View", in: Greenway, Frank, ed., Time and the Sciences, Paris: UNESCO: 21–37.
