= Edward Arthur Milne =

British astrophysicist and mathematician

Arthur Milne
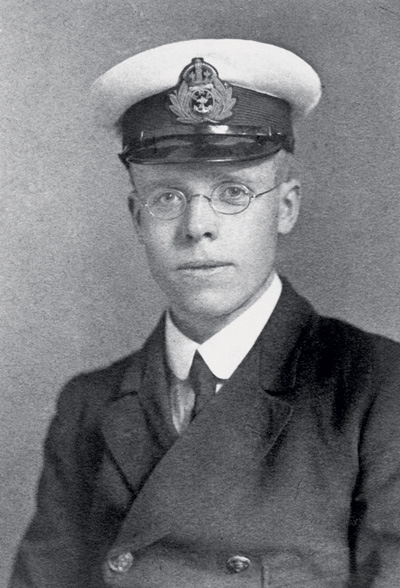
- Born: 14 February 1896; Kingston upon Hull, Yorkshire, England
- Died: 21 September 1950 (aged 54); Dublin, Ireland
- Education: Trinity College, Cambridge
- Known for: Milne model Degenerate stars
- Scientific career
- Workplaces: Victoria University of Manchester; University of Oxford
- Doctoral students: Thomas Cowling

Edward Arthur Milne FRS (/mɪln/; 14 February 1896 – 21 September 1950) was a British astrophysicist and mathematician.

== Biography ==
Milne was born in Hull, Yorkshire, England. He attended Hymers College and from there he won an open scholarship in mathematics and natural science to study at Trinity College, Cambridge in 1914, gaining the largest number of marks which had ever been awarded in the examination. In 1916 he joined a group of mathematicians led by A. V. Hill for the Ministry of munitions working on the ballistics of anti-aircraft gunnery, they became known as ′Hill's Brigands′. Later Milne became an expert on sound localisation. In 1917, he became a lieutenant in the Royal Naval Volunteer Reserve. He was a fellow of Trinity College, Cambridge, 1919–1925, being assistant director of the solar physics observatory, 1920–1924, mathematical lecturer at Trinity, 1924–1925, and university lecturer in astrophysics, 1922–1925. He was Beyer professor of applied mathematics, Victoria University of Manchester, 1924–1928, before his appointment as Rouse Ball Professor of Mathematics and to a fellowship at Wadham College, Oxford, in 1928. Milne's earlier work was in mathematical astrophysics. Much of his research in the 1930s was concerned with the theory of relativity and cosmology. His later work, concerned with the interior structure of stars, aroused controversy. Milne was President of the Royal Astronomical Society, 1943–1945. During World War II he again worked on ballistics.

Milne married Margaret Scott Campbell on 26 June 1928 at Withington, Manchester. Campbell, from Dornoch, Sutherland, Scotland, was the daughter of Hugh Fraser Campbell, an advocate in Aberdeen. Milne's brother, Geoffrey, then a lecturer in agricultural chemistry at the University of Leeds, was best man. Margaret Scott Milne died on the 5 October 1938 at Oxford. He married secondly, Beatrice Brevoort Renwick, the third daughter of William Whetten Renwick, on 22 June 1940 at St Andrew's Church, Oxford. William Whetten was the nephew of American architect James Renwick Jr., and designed Saints Peter and Paul, a Roman Catholic cathedral in Indianapolis, Indiana, United States. Beatrice Brevoort Milne died at Oxford on 28 August 1945, aged just 32 years. Milne died of a heart attack in Dublin, Ireland, while preparing to give a set of lectures. These can be found written down in one of his last published books: Modern Cosmology and the Christian Idea of God (1952).

== Research into stellar atmospheres and structure ==
In the 1920s much of Milne's research was concerned with stars, particularly the outer layers known as stellar atmospheres that produce the radiation observed from the Earth. He considered a grey atmosphere, a simplifying approximation in which the strength of the absorption of light by the hot ionized gas is the same at all wavelengths. This produced predictions of how temperature varies through the atmosphere, including the mathematical expression now known as the Milne Equation. He also calculated how the intensity of light from a star varies with wavelength on the basis of this model.

Milne moved on to consider the more realistic case where the strength of the absorption of light by gas within stars (expressed by the absorption coefficient) does vary with wavelength. Using simplifying assumptions he calculated how for the Sun the strength of the absorption depends on wavelength. His results could not be explained adequately at the time, but later negatively-charged hydrogen ions (H^{−}) were shown to be a major contributor to Milne's results.

Milne, working with Ralph H. Fowler, studied how the strengths of spectral lines of stars depend on their spectral type. In doing this they applied the work of Meghnad Saha about the ionization of gases to stellar atmospheres.

Milne worked on the structures and interiors of stars in the late 1920s and early 1930s. He often took opinions opposed to those of Arthur Eddington.

== Research into cosmology and relativity ==
From the early 1930s, Milne's interests focused increasingly on relativity theory and cosmology.

From 1932, he worked on the problem of the "expanding universe" and in Relativity, Gravitation, and World-Structure (1935), proposed an alternative to Albert Einstein's general relativity theory. With McCrea (1934) he also showed that the three models which form the foundations of modern cosmology first proposed by Friedmann (1922) using the general theory of relativity, can also be derived using only Newtonian mechanics.

Milne's alternative to general relativity theory based on kinematics was known as Kinematic Relativity. His theory was built on the special but not general theory of relativity. Because of this it has been described as a "nonrelativistic cosmology". Milne's theory met with opposition from others but inspired the steady-state theorists.

== Relativity, Gravitation, and World Structure ==
The main difference between the Milne model of an expanding universe, and the current (Einstein's) model of an expanding universe was that Milne did not assume a priori that the universe has a homogeneous matter distribution. He did not include the gravitation interaction into the model either.

Milne argued that under the context of Einstein's special relativity, and the relativity of simultaneity, that it is impossible for a nonstatic universe to be homogeneous. Namely, if the universe is spreading out, its density is decreasing over time, and that if two regions appeared to be at the same density at the same time to one observer, they would not appear to be the same density at the same time to another observer. However, if each observer measures its local density at the same agreed-upon proper time, the measured density should be the same. In Minkowskian coordinates, this constant proper time forms a hyperbolic surface which extends infinitely to the light-cone of the event of creation. This is true even when proper time approaches 0, the time of the creation. The universe is already infinite at the creation time!

Milne's model is, therefore, that of a sphere, with an approximately homogeneous matter distribution within several billion light years of the center which then increases to an infinite density. It can be shown that this infinite density is actually the density of the universe when at the time of the big bang. The spherical distribution is unique in that it is essentially the same after a Lorentz transformation, except that a different stationary particle is at the center. As it is the only distribution that has this property, it is the only distribution which could satisfy the cosmological principle of "no preferred reference frame." Based on this cosmological principle Milne created a model that can be described entirely within Euclidean geometry.

As of 1935, using this model, Milne published a prediction of the cosmic background radiation which appears to be of a much different character than that predicted by Eddington. In fact, many passages in Relativity, Gravitation and World Structure are devoted to attacking Eddington's preconceptions.

== Religious views ==
Milne was a Christian theist. In 1950, Milne gave ten lectures on Christianity and cosmology for the Edward Cadbury lectures which he was invited to give at the University of Birmingham. The lectures were published in the book Modern Cosmology and the Christian Idea of God, edited by Gerald James Whitrow and published in 1952.

Milne was a theistic evolutionist who held the view that God intervenes with "deft touches" to steer mutations in the right direction.

== Honours ==
=== Awards ===
- MBE (1918)
- Smith's Prize (1922)
- Gold Medal of the Royal Astronomical Society (1935)
- Royal Society's Royal Medal (1941)
- Bruce Medal (1945)

=== Named after him ===
- Milne, a crater on the Moon
- The E.A. Milne Centre for Astrophysics at the University of Hull (opened 2015)

== Books by Milne ==
- Thermodynamics of the Stars, Berlin: J. Springer, 1930.
- The White Dwarf Stars, Oxford: Clarendon Press, 1932.
- Relativity, gravitation and world-structure, Oxford: Clarendon Press, 1935.
- The Inverse Square Law of Gravitation, London: Harrison and Son, 1936.
- The Fundamental Concepts of Natural Philosophy, Edinburgh: Oliver & Boyd, 1943.
- Kinematic relativity; a sequel to Relativity, gravitation and world structure, Oxford: Clarendon Press, 1948.
- Vectorial Mechanics, New York: Interscience Publishers, 1948.
- Modern Cosmology and the Christian Idea of God, Oxford: Clarendon Press, 1952.
- Sir James Jeans: A Biography, Cambridge University Press, 1952.

== See also ==
- Alternatives to general relativity
- Herbert Dingle § Controversies
- List of science and religion scholars
- Blanketing effect
- Dirac large numbers hypothesis
- Milne's definition of local thermodynamic equilibrium
- Saha ionization equation

== Notes ==
Academic offices
Preceded by Sydney Chapman	Beyer Chair of Applied Mathematics at University of Manchester; 1925–1928	Succeeded by Douglas Hartree
Professional and academic associations
Preceded by William Henry Lang	Secretary of the Manchester Literary and Philosophical Society; 1927–29	Succeeded by D. C. Henry
