= Richard Bruce Paris =

British mathematician

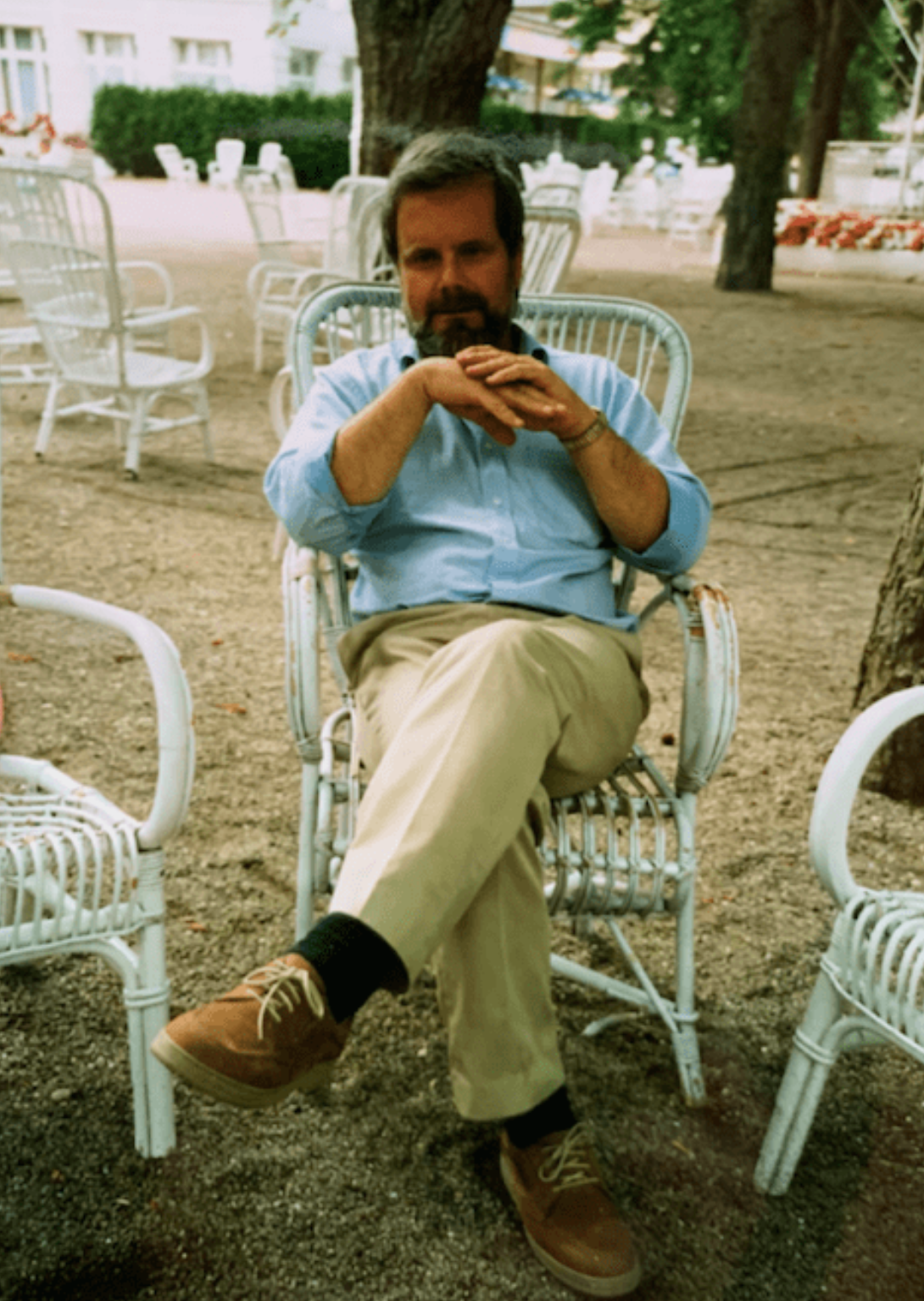
- Richard Bruce Paris in 2003
- Born: 23 January 1946; Bradford, UK
- Died: 8 July 2022 (aged 76)
- Education: University of Manchester
- Known for: special functions, Mellin-Barnes integrals, hyperasymptotics, Hadamard expansions
- Scientific career
- Fields: Mathematics
- Workplaces: Abertay University, Dundee
- Thesis: The Role of the Magnetic Field in Cosmogony (1971)
- Doctoral advisor: Leon Mestel

Richard Bruce Paris (23 January 1946 – 8 July 2022) was a British mathematician and reader at the Abertay University in Dundee, who specialized in calculus. He also had an honorary readership of the University of St. Andrews, Scotland. The research activity of Paris particularly concerned the asymptotics of integrals and properties of special functions. He is the author of Hadamard Expansions and Hyperasymptotic Evaluation: An Extension of the Method of Steepest Descent as well as the co-author of Asymptotics and Mellin-Barnes Integrals and of Asymptotics of High Order Differential Equations. In addition, he contributed to the NIST Handbook of Mathematical Functions and also released numerous papers for Proceedings of the Royal Society A, Methods and Applications of Analysis and the Journal of Computational and Applied Mathematics.

== Personal life ==
Born in 1946, Richard Bruce Paris was the son of an engineer. He spent his early childhood in the Yorkshire area until his family moved to the Wirral Peninsula, Cheshire, in the mid-1950s, due to the work of his father. There, Paris visited the Calday Grange Grammar School in West Kirby to eventually discover his interest in mathematics.

Paris was married to Jocelyne Marie-Louise Neidinger with whom he has a daughter Gaëlle and a son Simon.

== Career ==
In 1967, Paris acquired a first class honours degree in Mechanical Engineering from the Victoria University of Manchester. He continued his study at the university's department of mathematics, which he graduated as a Doctor of Philosophy in 1971. Paris was a doctoral student of the British-Australian astronomer Leon Mestel. His PhD thesis was finished under the title The Role of the Magnetic Field in Cosmogony.

After Paris finished his doctoral thesis, he moved to France to work for Euratom at the Department of Plasma Physics and Controlled Fusion in Fontenay-aux-Roses. In addition, from the late-1970s to the mid-1980s, Paris did several research visits in Los Alamos, USA. Finally, in 1984 he had to move to Southern France, due to a job transfer to Cadarache. In 1987, Paris quit his job at Euratom and moved to Scotland to work as a senior lecturer at the Abertay University in Dundee. A year later, in 1988, he received the honorary readership of the University of St. Andrews, Scotland. In 1999, he also achieved the degree of a Doctor of Science at the University of Manchester. Paris stayed at the University of Abertay, where he eventually obtained the status of a reader, until his retirement in 2010. Yet, this was not the end of his mathematical work but he kept contributing until his unexpected death in July 2022. In fact, one month earlier he shared his final article on ResearchGate.

In 1986, Paris became an elected fellow of the British Institute of Mathematics and its Applications.

== Work ==
The work of Paris deals with the asymptotic behaviour of a wide scope of special functions, in many case with a connection to physical problems.

In collaboration with David Kaminski, associate professor of mathematics at the University of Lethbridge, Paris published the monograph Asymptotics and Mellin-Barnes integrals. It is one of the few textbooks that extensively treats the application of Mellin transforms particularly to different asymptotic problems. Mellin-Barnes integrals constitute a special class of contour integrals that feature special functions in the integrand, most frequently products of gamma functions. Their evaluation relies on the residue theorem and requires appropriate manipulations of the integration path. The name is due to the mathematicians R. H. Mellin and E. W. Barnes. Many integrals can be transformed to a Mellin-Barnes representation, by writing their integrands in terms of inverse Mellin transforms. In the context of Laplace-type integrals, this technique provides a powerful alternative to Laplace's method. In general, however, it admits a broader applicability and much space for modifications. This versatility is shown by means of several examples from number theory and integrals of higher dimension.

In his monograph Hadamard Expansions and Hyperasymptotic Evaluation: An Extension of the Method of Steepest Descent, by means of theoretical and numerical examples, Paris illustrates the application of Laplace's method and possibilities to achieve a higher accuracy. The term Hadamard expansions describes a special kind of asymptotic expansions whose coefficients are again series. It refers to the French mathematician Jacques Hadamard who introduced the first series of this kind in 1908 in his paper Sur l'expression asymptotique de la fonction de Bessel.

Paris also organized the chapters 8 and 11, respectively about the incomplete Gamma and about the Struve functions and related functions, of the NIST Digital Library of Mathematical Functions and of the NIST Handbook of Mathematical Functions. He validated the original release in 2010 and was the Associate Editor for his chapters from 2015 until his death.

== Publications ==
- with A. D. Wood: Asymptotics of Higher Order Differential Equations, Longman Scientific and Technical, 1986, ISBN 0-470-20375-7
- with D. Kaminski: Asymptotics and Mellin-Barnes Integrals, Cambridge University Press, 2001, ISBN 978-0-521-79001-7 (vol. 85 of the Encyclopedia of Mathematics and its Applications)
- Hadamard Expansions and Hyperasymptotic Evaluation: An Extension of the Method of Steepest Descent, Cambridge University Press, 2011, ISBN 978-1-107-00258-6 (vol. 141 of the Encyclopedia of Mathematics and its Applications)
- with F. W. J. Olver, R. Askey et al.: NIST Handbook of Mathematical Functions, Cambridge University Press, 2010, Hardback ISBN 978-0-521-19225-5, Paperback ISBN 978-0-521-14063-8
