= Leon Mestel =

British astronomer

- Born: 5 August 1927; Melbourne, Australia
- Died: 15 September 2017 (aged 90); Cambridge, United Kingdom
- Education: Trinity College, Cambridge (B.A. 1948, PhD 1952)
- Awards: Eddington Medal (1993)
- Scientific career
- Workplaces: St John's College, Cambridge
- Thesis: Some Problems of Stellar Structure and Evolution (1952)
- Doctoral advisor: Fred Hoyle
- Doctoral students: Donald Lynden-Bell, Richard Bruce Paris

Leon Mestel (5 August 1927 – 15 September 2017) was a British-Australian astronomer and astrophysicist and emeritus Professor at the University of Sussex. His research interests were in the areas of star formation and structure, especially stellar magnetism and astrophysical magnetohydrodynamics. He was awarded both the Eddington Medal (1993) and the Gold Medal of the Royal Astronomical Society (for Astronomy, 2002). Following his retirement, he wrote several obituaries and biographical articles on physicists and astrophysicists.

== Early life and family ==
Leon Mestel was born on 5 August 1927 in Melbourne, Australia to Solomon Mestel, a rabbi and Rachel (née Brodetsky), a schoolteacher and sister of Selig Brodetsky. With his family, he migrated to England at the age of three, where he lived in Forest Gate, east London. He was educated at West Ham Secondary School, London, and Trinity College, Cambridge, where he obtained his BA in 1948 and his PhD in 1952.

He married Sylvia Louise Cole (d. 2014) in 1951, and they had two sons, Ben and Jonathan and two daughters Rosie and Leo. One of his sons is Jonathan Mestel (born 1957), a mathematics professor and chess grandmaster. In 1982, as part of a memorial series of annual lectures at the University of Leeds commemorating his maternal uncle, Leon Mestel gave the 23rd Selig Brodetsky Memorial Lecture, titled Astronomy: A Mirror to Physics.

== Research career ==
Mestel's research interests were in the area of astrophysics, including: stellar structure, stellar evolution, star formation, cosmic magnetism and pulsar electrodynamics.

At the time he was completing his PhD, Mestel took a position as an ICI Research Fellow at the Department of Mathematics in the University of Leeds, carrying out research there in the three-year period from 1951 to 1954. Also during this period, in 1952, he was elected a Fellow of the Royal Astronomical Society (FRAS). Mestel then spent the academic year of 1954–5 as a Commonwealth Fund Fellow at the Observatory at Princeton University.

Returning to England, he was a lecturer in mathematics at the University of Cambridge for eleven years from 1955 to 1966, first as an assistant lecturer (1955–1958) and then as a full lecturer (1958–1966). While at Cambridge, he was a Fellow of St John's College from 1957 to 1966. This time at Cambridge included a period as a visiting member of the Institute for Advanced Study in Princeton, New Jersey, during the academic year of 1961–2.

In 1963, he published a paper describing a phenomenon that occurs during galaxy and star formation that came to be known as a 'Mestel disk'.

Mestel left Cambridge in 1966 after being appointed to the position of professor at the University of Manchester, but before taking up his appointment there he spent the academic year of 1966–7 as JFK Fellow at the Weizmann Institute, Israel. Returning to England, he spent six years as professor of applied mathematics in Manchester (1967–1973). The fourth and final stage of his career was as professor of astronomy at the University of Sussex, a position he took up in 1973 and held for nineteen years.

Mestel was elected a Fellow of the Royal Society (FRS) in 1977. He retired in 1992, becoming Emeritus Professor at Sussex.

== Awards and honours ==
- 1993 – Eddington Medal for "his fundamental work on cosmic magnetism"
- 2002 – Gold Medal of the Royal Astronomical Society (for Astronomy, 2002).

== Later years ==
After retiring, Mestel wrote several obituaries and biographical articles on physicists and astrophysicists for publications such as The Independent, the Oxford Dictionary of National Biography, and Biographical Memoirs of Fellows of the Royal Society. Those for whom Mestel wrote obituaries and articles include Martin Schwarzschild, Roger John Tayler, William McCrea, Hermann Bondi, Subrahmanyan Chandrasekhar, and Thomas George Cowling. Mestel also contributed the Oxford Dictionary of National Biography entry for Selig Brodetsky.

In 2002, Mestel was an invited speaker at a conference held in Cardiff, Wales, in memory of Fred Hoyle. In 2004, together with John D. Barrow, Mestel organised a Commemoration Meeting at the Royal Astronomical Society to mark 60 years since the death of Arthur Eddington, publishing a paper on Eddington later the same year. In 2009, Mestel featured in Portraits of Astronomers, a book by Lucinda Douglas-Menzies with portraits of thirty-eight leading UK astronomers. In 2008, he moved back to his family in Cambridge, where he died in September 2017.

== Bibliography ==
- 'Why Does the Sun Shine?', essay in The Emerging Universe (1972)
- Stellar Magnetism (1999), leading monograph on the subject
- Stellar Magnetism (2003), later edition of the earlier work
- 'Stellar Rotation: A Historical Survey', chapter in Stellar Astrophysical Fluid Dynamics (2003)
- 'Astrophysical MHD – The Early Years', chapter in Magnetohydrodynamics (2007)
