= Raymond Lyttleton =

British mathematician, astronomer

- Born: 7 May 1911; Warley Woods
- Died: 16 May 1995 (aged 84)
- Known for: Flying sandbank model Lyttleton's scenario Bondi–Hoyle–Lyttleton accretion
- Awards: Royal Medal (1965); Gold Medal of the RAS (1959); Tyson Medal (1933)
- Scientific career
- Fields: astronomy

Raymond Arthur Lyttleton FRS (7 May 1911 – 16 May 1995) was a British mathematician and theoretical astronomer.

He was born in Warley Woods near Birmingham and educated at King Edward VI Five Ways school in Birmingham, going from there to Clare College, Cambridge to read mathematics, graduating in 1933. He was elected a Fellow of St John's College in 1937 and appointed a lecturer in mathematics in the same year (until 1959). A keen amateur cricketer, he played minor counties cricket for Cambridgeshire from 1946–1949, making fifteen appearances. He was Reader in Theoretical Astronomy from 1959 to 1969, after which he was appointed to a specially created professorship in the subject.

He was elected a Fellow of the Royal Society in 1955. His application citation read: "Distinguished for his work in astronomy. Author of numerous papers on the origin and early history of the Solar System, notably his modifications of the collision theory. Showed from work of Cartan that fission of a planet by rotation would give two independent bodies, and consequently that the fission theory of binary stars is untenable (The Stability of Rotating Liquid Masses, 1953). Author (with F. Hoyle) of numerous papers on the astronomical effects of accretion, and (with H. Bondi) of two on the transmission of the tidal friction couple to the Earth's core and on the behaviour of the core during precessions. Author of a striking new theory of comets. (The Comets and their Origin, 1953)

He won the Royal Society Royal Medal in 1965 "In recognition of his distinguished contributions to astronomy, particularly for his work on the dynamical stability of galaxies."

He wrote a number of books: The Comets and Their Origin (1953), The Stability of Rotating Liquid Masses (1953), The Modern Universe {1956}, Rival Theories of Cosmology {1960}, Man's View of the Universe (1961), Mysteries of the Solar System (1968), The Earth and its Mountains (1982), The Gold Effect (1990). In 1956, he presented a 5-part television series on the B.B.C. entitled "The Modern Universe"

He had married Meave Hobden in Poole in 1939.

== Read also ==
- Lyttleton, Raymond Arthur (1968) Mysteries of the Solar System, Clarendon, Oxford.
