= QHD =

QHD or qHD can refer to:

- Quad HD, a video resolution at 1440p or 1540p
- Quarter HD, a video resolution at 540p
- Quantum hadrodynamics
- Quantum hydrodynamics
- Qinghuangdao (Chinese: 秦皇岛), Hebei, China
