= Yukawa coupling =

Scalar–fermion interaction

In particle physics, the Yukawa coupling or Yukawa interaction, named after Hideki Yukawa, is an interaction between particles according to the Yukawa potential. Specifically, it is between a scalar field (or pseudoscalar field) $\phi$ and a Dirac field $\psi$ of the type

$V = g\ \bar\psi \phi \psi$ (scalar) or $g\ \bar\psi i \gamma^5 \phi \psi$ (pseudoscalar).

The Yukawa coupling was developed to model the strong force between hadrons. Yukawa couplings are thus used to describe the nuclear force between nucleons mediated by pions (which are pseudoscalar mesons).

Yukawa couplings are also used in the Standard Model to describe the coupling between the Higgs field and massless quark and lepton fields (i.e., the fundamental fermion particles). Through spontaneous symmetry breaking, these fermions acquire a mass proportional to the vacuum expectation value of the Higgs field. This Higgs–fermion coupling was first described by Steven Weinberg in 1967 to model lepton masses.

== Classical potential ==
If two fermions interact through a Yukawa interaction mediated by a Yukawa particle of mass μ, the potential between the two particles, known as the Yukawa potential, will be:
$$V(r) = -\frac{g^2}{\,4\pi\,} \, \frac{1}{\,r\,} \, e^{-\mu r}$$
which is the same as a Coulomb potential except for the sign and the exponential factor. The sign will make the interaction attractive between all particles (the electromagnetic interaction is repulsive for same electrical charge sign particles). This is explained by the fact that the Yukawa particle has spin zero and even spin always results in an attractive potential. (It is a non-trivial result of quantum field theory that the exchange of even-spin bosons like the pion (spin 0, Yukawa force) or the graviton (spin 2, gravity) results in forces always attractive, while odd-spin bosons like the gluons (spin 1, strong interaction), the photon (spin 1, electromagnetic force) or the rho meson (spin 1, Yukawa-like interaction) yields a force that is attractive between opposite charge and repulsive between like-charge.) The negative sign in the exponential gives the interaction a finite effective range, so that particles at great distances will hardly interact any longer (interaction forces fall off exponentially with increasing separation).

As for other forces, the form of the Yukawa potential has a geometrical interpretation in term of the field line picture introduced by Faraday: The 1/r part results from the dilution of the field line flux in space. The force is proportional to the number of field lines crossing an elementary surface. Since the field lines are emitted isotropically from the force source and since the distance r between the elementary surface and the source varies the apparent size of the surface (the solid angle) as 1/r^{2} the force also follows the 1/r^{2} dependence. This is equivalent to the 1/r part of the potential. In addition, the exchanged mesons are unstable and have a finite lifetime. The disappearance (radioactive decay) of the mesons causes a reduction of the flux through the surface that results in the additional exponential factor e^{−μr} of the Yukawa potential. Massless particles such as photons are stable and thus yield only 1/r potentials. (Note however that other massless particles such as gluons or gravitons do not generally yield 1/r potentials because they interact with each other, distorting their field pattern. When this self-interaction is negligible, such as in weak-field gravity (Newtonian gravitation) or for very short distances for the strong interaction (asymptotic freedom), the 1/r potential is restored.)

== Action ==
The Yukawa interaction is an interaction between a scalar field (or pseudoscalar field) ϕ and a Dirac field ψ of the type

$V \approx g\,\bar\psi \phi \psi$ (scalar) or $g \,\bar\psi i \gamma^5 \phi \psi$ (pseudoscalar).

The action for a meson field $\phi$ interacting with a Dirac baryon field $\psi$ is
$$S[\phi,\psi]=\int \left[ \,
\mathcal{L}_\mathrm{meson}(\phi) +
\mathcal{L}_\mathrm{Dirac}(\psi) +
\mathcal{L}_\mathrm{Yukawa}(\phi,\psi)
\, \right] \mathrm{d}^{n}x$$
where the integration is performed over n dimensions; for typical four-dimensional spacetime n = 4, and $\mathrm{d}^{4}x \equiv \mathrm{d}x_1 \, \mathrm{d}x_2 \, \mathrm{d}x_3 \, \mathrm{d}x_4$.

The meson Lagrangian is given by
$$\mathcal{L}_\mathrm{meson}(\phi) = \frac{1}{2}\partial^\mu \phi \; \partial_\mu \phi - V(\phi)~.$$

Here, $V(\phi)$ is a self-interaction term. For a free-field massive meson, one would have $\textstyle V(\phi)=\frac{1}{2}\mu^2\phi^2$, where $\mu$ is the mass for the meson. For a (renormalizable, polynomial) self-interacting field, one will have $\textstyle V(\phi) = \frac{1}{2}\mu^2\phi^2 + \lambda\phi^4$, where λ is a coupling constant. This potential is explored in detail in the article on the quartic interaction.

The free-field Dirac Lagrangian is given by
$$\mathcal{L}_\mathrm{Dirac}(\psi) = \bar{\psi}\,\left( i\,\partial\!\!\!/ - m \right)\,\psi ,$$
where m is the real-valued, positive mass of the fermion.

The Yukawa interaction term is
$$\mathcal{L}_\mathrm{Yukawa}(\phi,\psi) = -g\,\bar\psi \,\phi \,\psi ,$$
where g is the (real) coupling constant for scalar mesons and
$$\mathcal{L}_\mathrm{Yukawa}(\phi,\psi) = -g\,\bar\psi \,i \,\gamma^5 \,\phi \,\psi$$
for pseudoscalar mesons. Putting it all together one can write the above more explicitly as
$$S[\phi,\psi] = \int \left[ \tfrac{1}{2} \, \partial^\mu \phi \; \partial_\mu \phi - V(\phi) + \bar{\psi} \, \left( i\, \partial\!\!\!/ - m \right) \, \psi - g \, \bar{\psi} \, \phi \,\psi \, \right] \mathrm{d}^{n}x ~.$$

== Coupling to Higgs in the Standard Model ==
A Yukawa coupling term to the Higgs field affecting spontaneous symmetry breaking in the Standard Model is responsible for fermion masses in a symmetric manner.

Suppose that the potential $V(\phi)$ has its minimum, not at $\phi = 0$, but at some non-zero value $\phi_0$. This can happen, for example, with a potential form such as $V(\phi) = \lambda\phi^4 - \mu^2\phi^2$. In this case, the Lagrangian exhibits spontaneous symmetry breaking. This is because the non-zero value of the $\phi$ field, when operating on the vacuum, has a non-zero vacuum expectation value of $\phi$.

In the Standard Model, this non-zero expectation is responsible for the fermion masses despite the chiral symmetry of the model apparently excluding them. To exhibit the mass term, the action can be re-expressed in terms of the derived field $\phi' = \phi - \phi_0$, where $\phi_0$ is constructed to be independent of position (a constant). This means that the Yukawa term includes a component
$$g \, \phi_0 \, \bar\psi \, \psi$$
and, since both g and $\phi_0$ are constants, the term presents as a mass term for the fermion with equivalent mass $g\phi_0$. This mechanism is the means by which spontaneous symmetry breaking gives mass to fermions. The scalar field $\phi'$ is known as the Higgs field.

The Yukawa coupling for any given fermion in the Standard Model is an input to the theory. The ultimate reason for these couplings is not known: it would be something that a better, deeper theory should explain.

== Majorana form ==
It is also possible to have a Yukawa interaction between a scalar and a Majorana field. In fact, the Yukawa interaction involving a scalar and a Dirac spinor can be thought of as a Yukawa interaction involving a scalar with two Majorana spinors of the same mass. Broken out in terms of the two chiral Majorana spinors, one has
$$S[\phi,\chi]=\int \left[\,\frac{1}{2}\,\partial^\mu\phi \; \partial_\mu \phi - V(\phi) + \chi^\dagger \, i \, \bar{\sigma}\,\cdot\,\partial\chi + \frac{i}{2}\,(m + g \, \phi)\,\chi^\mathrm{T} \,\sigma^2 \,\chi - \frac{i}{2}\,(m + g \,\phi)^* \, \chi^\dagger \,\sigma^2 \, \chi^*\,\right] \mathrm{d}^{n}x ,$$
where g is a complex coupling constant, m is a complex number, and n is the number of dimensions, as above.

== See also ==
- The article Yukawa potential provides a simple example of the Feynman rules and a calculation of a scattering amplitude from a Feynman diagram involving a Yukawa interaction.
