= Einstein–Brillouin–Keller method =

Semi-classical method for computing quantum eigenvalues

The Einstein–Brillouin–Keller (EBK) method is a semiclassical technique (named after Albert Einstein, Léon Brillouin, and Joseph B. Keller) used to compute eigenvalues in quantum-mechanical systems. EBK quantization is an improvement from Bohr–Sommerfeld quantization which did not consider the caustic phase jumps at classical turning points. This procedure is able to reproduce exactly the spectrum of the 3D harmonic oscillator, particle in a box, and even the relativistic fine structure of the hydrogen atom.

== History ==
The first paper by Albert Einstein in 1917 generalized Bohr–Sommerfeld quantization as part of the old quantum theory. Einstein also discussed that the method was not generalizable for chaotic systems. The paper was influential for Louis de Broglie thesis in 1924 and Erwin Schrödinger reformulation of quantum mechanics in terms of the Schrödinger equation in 1926.

Another correction to Bohr–Sommerfeld quantization was introduced by Léon Brillouin in 1926, who also introduced the same year the WKB approximation. Mathematician Rudolf Ernest Langer also introduced his Langer correction in 1937.

Einstein's formulation however was mostly ignored, until its independent discovery by Joseph Keller in 1958. Keller derived his equation from the WKB approximation and introduced the correction of caustic phase jumps at classical turning points. In 1972, mathematician Viktor Maslov formalized the concept in terms of Maslov indexes.

Ian C. Percival reintroduced Einstein's paper to the physics community in 1973, and coined the term Einstein–Brillouin–Keller method.

In 1976–1977, Michael Berry and Michael Tabor derived an extension to Gutzwiller trace formula for the density of states of an integrable system starting from EBK quantization.

== Procedure ==
Given a separable classical system defined by conjugate coordinates $(q_i,p_i);i\in\{1,2,\cdots,d\}$, in which every pair $(q_i,p_i)$ describes a closed or periodic function in $q_i$, the EBK procedure involves quantizing the line integrals of $p_i$ over the closed orbit of $q_i$:

$$I_i=\frac{1}{2\pi}\oint p_i dq_i = \hbar \left(n_i+\frac{\mu_i}{4}+\frac{b_i}{2}\right)$$

where $I_i$ is the action-angle coordinate, $n_i$ a nonnegative integer, $\mu_i$ the number of classical turning points in the trajectory of $q_i$ (the Neumann boundary condition), and $b_i$ the number of reflections with a hard wall (the Dirichlet boundary condition). Together, $\mu_i$ and $b_i$ are called the Maslov indices.

== Examples ==
=== 1D Harmonic oscillator ===
The Hamiltonian of a simple harmonic oscillator is given by

$$H=\frac{p^2}{2m}+\frac{m\omega^2x^2}{2}$$

where $p$ is the linear momentum and $x$ the position coordinate. The action variable is given by

$$I=\frac{2}{\pi}\int_0^{x_0}\sqrt{2mE-m^2\omega^2x^2}\mathrm{d}x$$

where $H=E$ is the energy and that the closed trajectory is 4 times the trajectory from 0 to the turning point $x_0=\sqrt{2E/m\omega^2}$.

The integral turns out to be

$$E=I\omega$$,

which under EBK quantization there are two soft turning points in each orbit $\mu_x=2$ and $b_x=0$. Finally, that yields

$$E=\hbar \omega \left(n + \frac{1}{2} \right)$$,

which is the exact result for the energy levels of the quantum harmonic oscillator.

=== 2D hydrogen atom ===
The Hamiltonian for a non-relativistic electron (with charge $e$) in a hydrogen atom is:

$$H=\frac{p_r^2}{2m}+\frac{p_\varphi^2}{2mr^2}-\frac{e^2}{4\pi\epsilon_{0} r}$$

where $p_r$ is the canonical momentum of the radial distance $r$, and $p_\varphi$ is the canonical momentum of the azimuthal angle $\varphi$. Take the action-angle coordinates:

$$I_\varphi=\text{constant}=|L|$$

For the radial coordinate $r$:

$$p_r=\sqrt{2mE-\frac{L^2}{r^2}+\frac{e^2}{4\pi\epsilon_0 r}}$$
$$I_r=\frac{1}{\pi}\int_{r_1}^{r_2} p_r dr = \frac{me^2}{4\pi\epsilon_0\sqrt{-2mE}}-|L|$$

where we are integrating between the two classical turning points $r_1,r_2$ ($\mu_r=2$)

$$E=-\frac{me^4}{32\pi^2\epsilon_0^2(I_r+I_\varphi)^2}$$

Using EBK quantization $b_r=\mu_\varphi=b_\varphi=0,n_\varphi=m$ :

$$I_\varphi=\hbar m\quad;\quad m=0,1,2,\cdots$$
$$I_r=\hbar(n_r+1/2)\quad;\quad n_r=0,1,2,\cdots$$
$$E=-\frac{me^4}{32\pi^2\epsilon_0^2\hbar^2(n_r+m+1/2)^2}$$

and by making $n=n_r+m+1$ the spectrum of the 2D hydrogen atom is recovered :

$$E_n=-\frac{me^4}{32\pi^2\epsilon_0^2\hbar^2(n-1/2)^2}\quad;\quad n=1,2,3,\cdots$$

Note that for this case $I_\varphi=|L|$ almost coincides with the usual quantization of the angular momentum operator on the plane $L_z$. For the 3D case, the EBK method for the total angular momentum is equivalent to the Langer correction.

== See also ==
- Hamilton–Jacobi equation
- WKB approximation
- Quantum chaos
