= Charlotte Elster =

German-American physicist

Charlotte Elster is a German-American theoretical nuclear physicist whose early work made significant contributions to the formulation of the Bonn potential for the nuclear force, in joint work with Ruprecht Machleidt and Karl Holinde. In later research, she has developed methods for supercomputers to model few-body systems, including light nuclei. She is a professor of physics at Ohio University.

== Education and career ==
Elster studied theoretical physics at the University of Bonn, earning a diploma there in 1983 and completing her Ph.D. in 1986. After postdoctoral research at Kent State University, the University of Maryland, and Ohio State University, she became an assistant professor of physics at Ohio University in 1991. She was promoted to associate professor in 1996 and full professor in 2002, and served as director of the Institute of Nuclear and Particle Physics from 2003 to 2009.

== Recognition ==
Elster was named a Fellow of the American Physical Society (APS) in 2001, after a nomination from the APS Topical Group on Few-Body Systems and Multiparticle Dynamics, "for her significant contributions to the understanding of the nucleon-nucleon interaction and its applications in few-body systems and nuclear reactions".

== Personal life ==
As well as being a physicist, Elster is a devoted amateur figure skater.
