= Shape of the atomic nucleus =

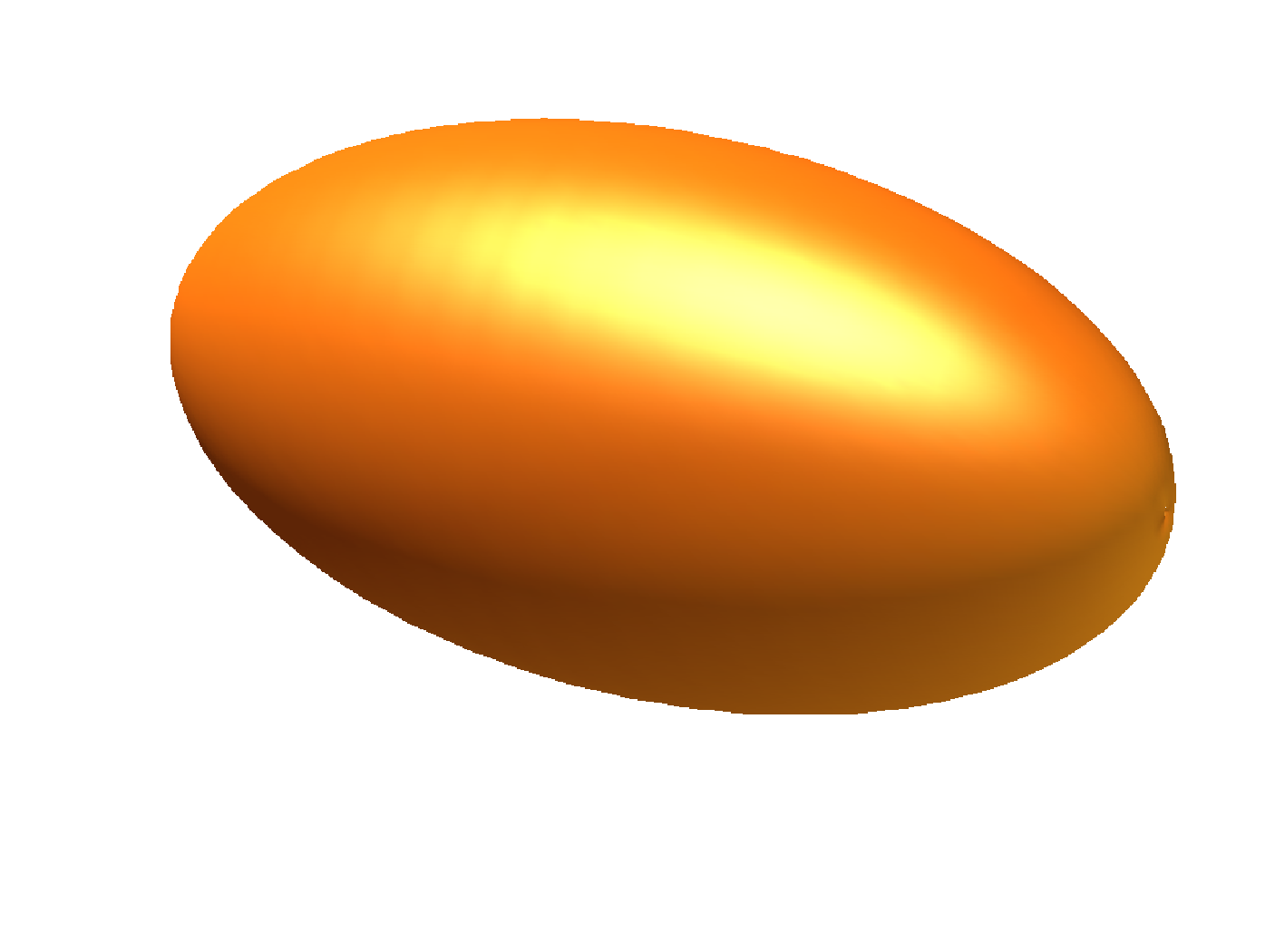
The prolate spheroid shape of the proton and neutron derived from the analysis of the electromagnetic transition from ground to the excited state.

The shape of the atomic nucleus depends on the variety of factors related to the size and shape of its nucleon (proton or neutron) constituents and the nuclear force holding them together. The spatial extent of the prolate spheroid nucleon (and larger nuclides) is determined by root mean squared (RMS) charge radius of the proton, as determined mainly by electron and muon scattering experiments, as well as spectroscopic experiments. An important factor in the internal structure of the nucleus is the nucleon-nucleon potential, which ultimately governs the distance between individual nucleons, and the radial charge density of each nuclide. The charge density of some light nuclide indicates a lesser density of nucleonic matter in the center which may have implications for a nucleonic nuclear structure. A surprising non-spherical expectation for the shape of the nucleus originated in 1939 in the spectroscopic analysis of the quadrupole moments while the prolate spheroid shape of the nucleon arises from analysis of the intrinsic quadrupole moment. The simple spherical approximation of nuclear size and shape provides at best a textbook introduction to nuclear size and shape. The unusual cosmic abundance of alpha nuclides has inspired geometric arrangements of alpha particles as a solution to nuclear shapes, although the atomic nucleus generally assumes a prolate spheroid shape. Nuclides can also be discus-shaped (oblate deformation), triaxial (shape of an ellipsoid with its three principal axes having different lengths) or pear-shaped.

== Origins of nuclear shape ==
The atomic nucleus is composed of protons and neutrons (collectively called nucleons). In the Standard Model of particle physics, nucleons are in the group called hadrons, the smallest known particles in the universe to have measurable size and shape. Each is in turn composed of three quarks. The spatial extent and shape of nucleons (and nuclides assembled from them) ultimately involves quark interactions within and between nucleons. The quark itself does not have measurable size at the experimental limit set by the electron (≈ 10^{−18} m in diameter). The size, or RMS charge radius, of the proton (the smallest nuclide) has a 2018 CODATA recommended value of 0.8414 (19) fm (10^{−15} m), although values may vary by a few percent according to the experimental method employed (see proton radius puzzle). Nuclide size ranges up to ≈ 6 fm. The largest stable nuclide, lead-208, has an RMS charge radius of 5.5012 fm, and the largest unstable nuclide americium-243 has an experimental RMS charge radius of 5.9048 fm. The main source of nuclear radius values derives from elastic scattering experiments (electron and muon), but nuclear radii data also come from experiments on spectroscopic isotope shifts (x-ray and optical), β decay by mirror nuclei, α decay, and neutron scattering. Although the radius values delimit the spatial extent of the nucleus, spectroscopic and scattering experiments dating back to 1935 in many cases indicate a deviation of the nuclear charge distribution or quadrupole moment consistent with non-spherical nuclear shapes for many nuclei.

== Simple spherical approximation ==
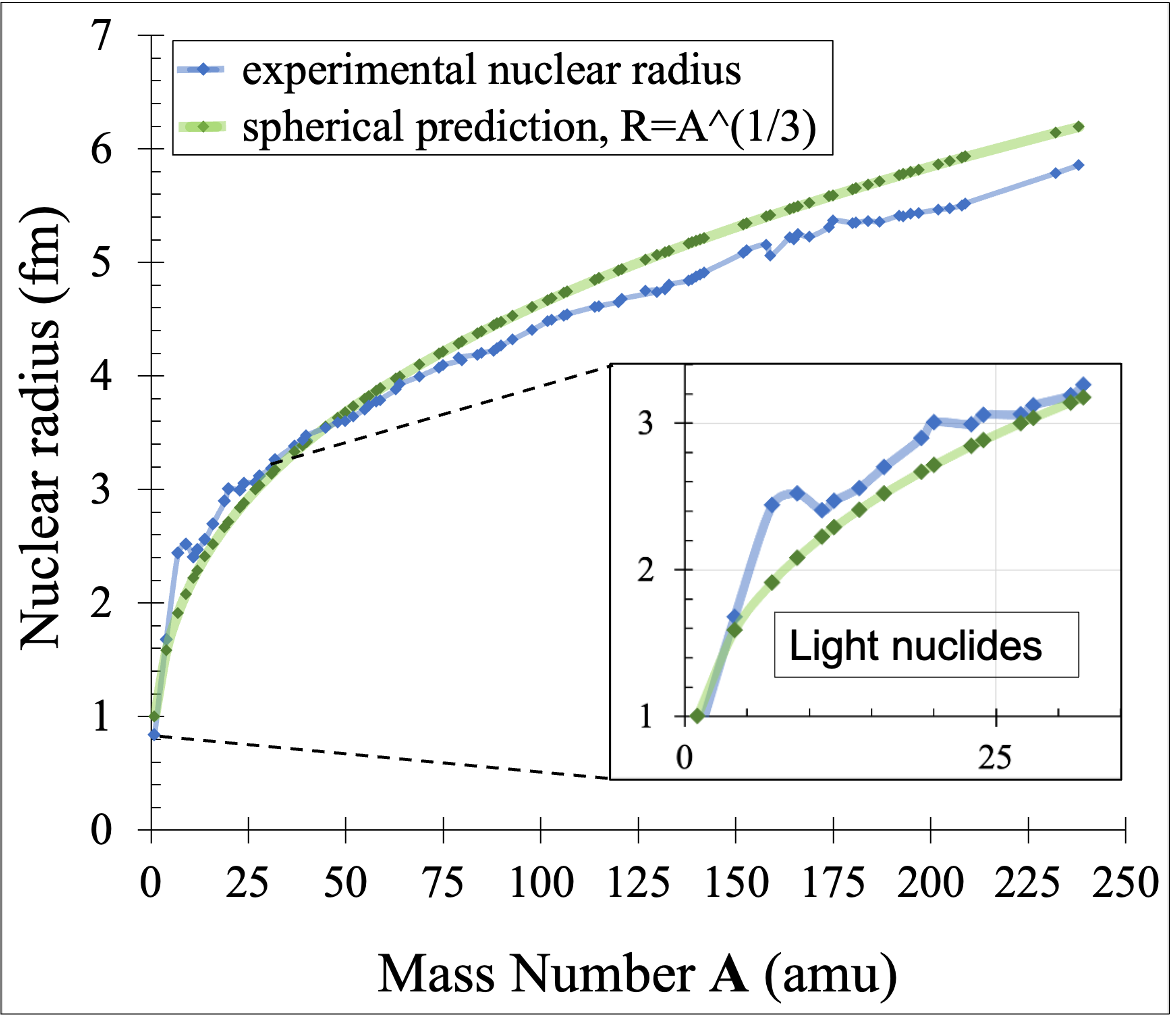
The spherical radius prediction approximates the experimental RMS charge radius above $A$ ≈ 40 (data from)

The atomic nucleus can be visualized as a compact bundle of nucleons represented as hard-packed spheres. This depiction of the nucleus only approximates the empirical evidence for the size and shape of the nucleus. The RMS charge radius of most stable (and many unstable) nuclides has been experimentally determined. If the nucleus is assumed to be spherically symmetric, an approximate relationship between nuclear radius and mass number is given by $R = R_0 A^{1/3}$ above $A$ = 40, where $R$ is the predicted spherical nuclear radius, $A$ is the mass number, and $R_0$ = 1.2 ± 0.2 fm is an experimentally-determined constant. This radius-to-mass relationship has its origin in the liquid drop model as proposed by Gamow in 1930. The graph on the right shows experimental charge radius as a function of mass number (blue line) as compared to the spherical approximation (green line). For $A$ ≤ 40, the curvilinear spherical radius contrasts with measurement; for $A$ ≥ 40, there is better agreement when $R_0$ = 1.0 fm.

== Nucleon shape ==
The empirical knowledge of nucleon shape originates from the study of the transition from the proton ground state N(938) to the first excited state ∆^{+}(1232). Multiple studies using a variety of models have led to an expectation of non-spherical shape. The proton's RMS charge radius of 0.8414 fm only defines the spatial extent of its charge distribution, i.e. the distance from its center of mass to its farthest point. Examination of the angular dependence of the charge distribution indicates that the proton is not a perfect sphere. Model-dependent analyses of the intrinsic quadrupole moment suggests that the ground-state nucleon shape conforms to a prolate spheroid shape.

The intrinsic quadrupole moment is distinct from the spectroscopic quadrupole moment, as realized more than 50 years ago. The intrinsic quadrupole moment relates to a body-fixed coordinate system that rotates with the nucleon in contrast to the spectroscopically measured quadrupole moment. While the nucleon's spectroscopic quadrupole moment is zero due to angular moment selection rules related to spin, the non-zero intrinsic quadrupole is obtained by electromagnetic quadrupole transitions between the nucleon ground N(938) and ∆(1232) excited states. The proton and neutron have nearly the same mass (938 MeV), and may be regarded as one particle, the nucleon N(938), with two different charge states (proton +1, and neutron 0). The proton's N(938) ground state and ∆^{+}(1232) excited state have different shapes. The transition between the states supports a prolate spheroid deformation for the ground state, and an oblate spheroid deformation for the excited state.

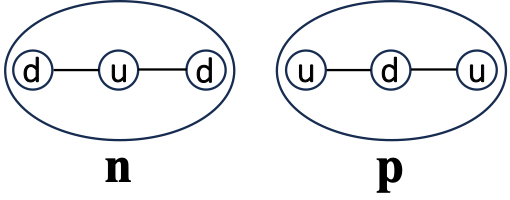
Qualitative picture of spin-spin force repelling like-flavored quarks to opposite ends of prolate nucleons.

The prolate shaped ground state reflects quark-to-quark interactions arising from the Pauli exclusion principle. The Pauli exclusion principle, sometimes referred to as the Pauli exclusion force, is a fundamental rule in quantum mechanics stating that no two fermions (particles with half-integer spin such as electrons or quarks) can occupy the same quantum state simultaneously. In the ground state, the two down quarks of a ground-state neutron are in an isospin 1 state, and simultaneously in a spin 1 state in order that the spin-isospin wave function is symmetric. The consequence of this quantum mechanical constraint is that the likelihood of finding the neutron's two identical down quarks near one another is small, but increases with distance between them. Thus, within the spatial extent of the prolate spheroid neutron, the two down quarks will most likely be at opposite ends of the prolate spheroid. A similar quantum mechanical constraint applies to the two identical up quarks of the proton. Accordingly, the spin-spin interactions between identical fermions result in finding like-flavored quarks further apart. Conversely, when the spins of a pair of unlike fermions align, such as an up-/down-quark pair within a ground-state nucleon, the nuclear force draws the particles close to other each other without violating the Pauli exclusion principle. Within the ground state neutron, this results in a picture of the spin interactions (above) in which the two down quarks (like fermions) qualitatively reside on either end of the prolate nucleon structure while simultaneously attracting to the up quark (unlike fermion) in the middle. Similar spin-spin interactions play out in the proton, considered identical to the neutron but existing in a different charge state.

Electron scattering techniques pioneered by Robert Hofstadter gave the first indication of a deeper structure for the nucleon. The technique is similar in principle to Rutherford's gold foil experiment in which alpha particles are directed at a thin gold foil, but Hofstadter's use of electrons, rather than alpha particles, enabled much higher resolution. The radial charge density of the neutron in particular was shown to have a complex internal structure consisting of a positive core and a negative skin, qualitatively consistent with the neutron's quark charge distribution shown above. Hofstadter received a Nobel prize for this work in 1961, several years before Murray Gell-Mann posited the quark model in 1965.

== Space between nucleons ==
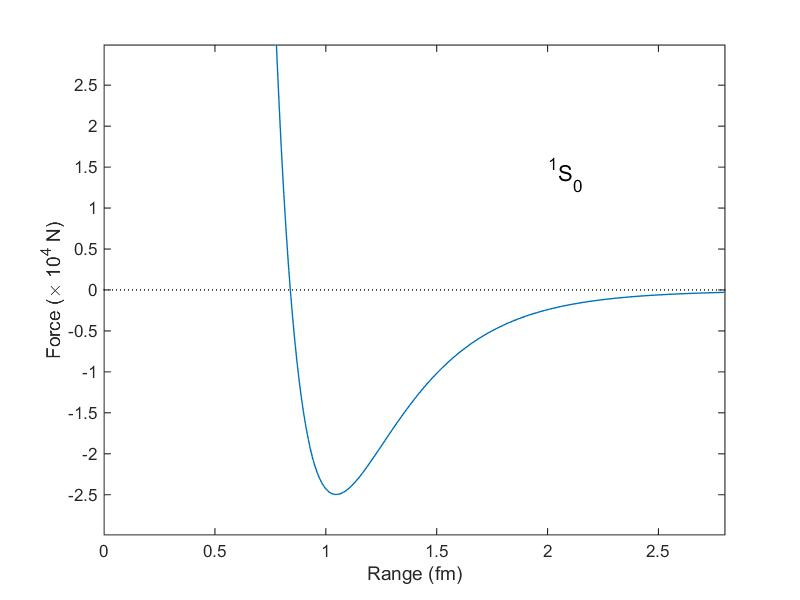
The derivative of the Reid potential illustrates the attractive and repulsive forces between nucleons that determines the space between them.

The atomic nucleus is a bound system of protons and neutrons. The spatial extent and shape of the nucleus depend not only on the size and shape of discrete nucleons, but also on the distance between them (the inter-nucleon distance). (Other factors include spin, alignment, orbital motion, and the local nuclear environment (see EMC effect).) The proximity of adjacent nucleons is governed by the nucleon-nucleon potential, and the force between a pair of nucleons can be obtained by taking the derivative of the potential. The strong nuclear force between nucleons is short-range, and the interaction between a pair of nucleons depends on the distance between them . Below 0.5 fm, each nucleon has a repulsive hard core that prevents neighboring nucleons from approaching any closer. Repulsive and attractive forces balance at ≈ 0.8 fm, and become maximally attractive at ≈ 1.0 fm, as illustrated in the diagram. Because energy is required to separate them, the pair of nucleons are said to be in a bound state. The proton-neutron (p-n) bound state, or p-n pair, is stable and ubiquitous in baryonic matter. The p-n pair contributes implicitly to the top ten most abundant isotopes in the universe, eight of which contain equal numbers of protons and neutrons (see Oddo-Harkins rule and abundance of the elements). Conversely, the proton-proton (diproton) and neutron-neutron (dineutron) bound states are unstable and therefore rarely found in nature. The deuteron (the simplest p-n pair) has a prolate shape as indicated by its quadrupole moment. The transverse charge density of the deuteron confirms this prolate or elongated shape.

== Soft core of light nuclides ==
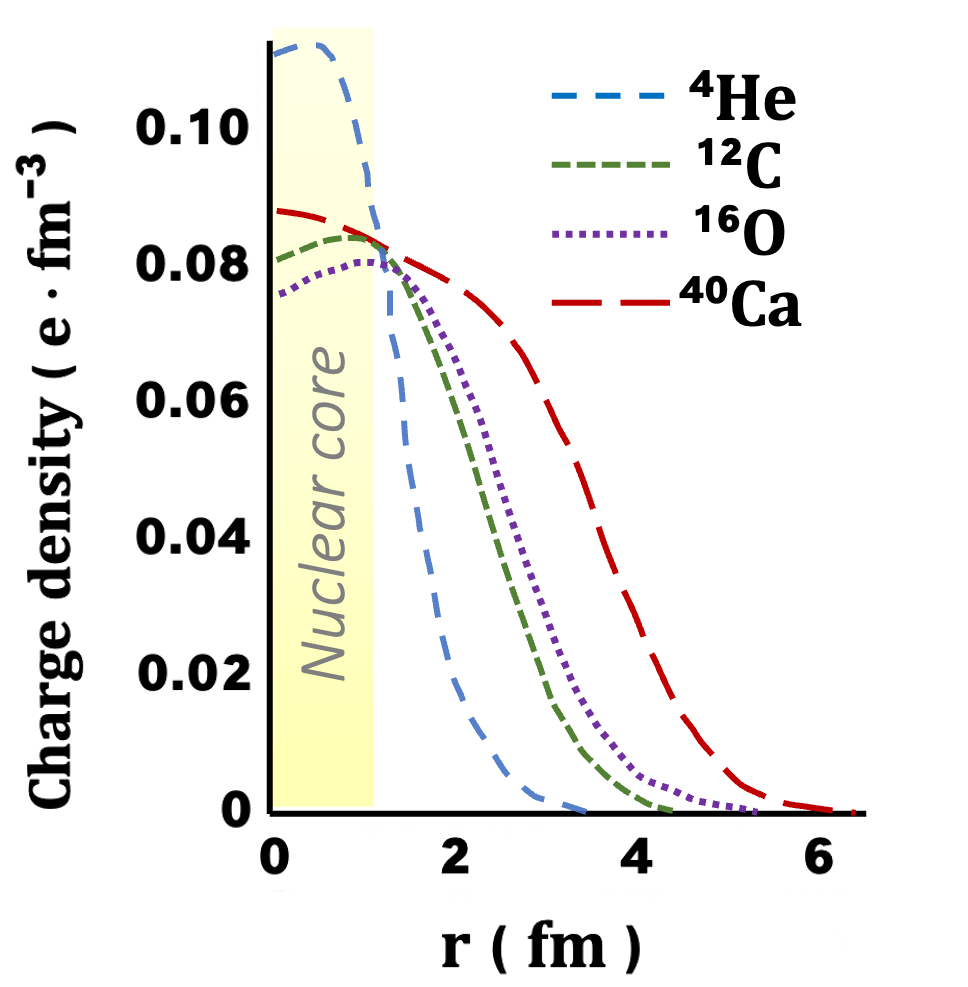
The dip in the charge density near the Y-axis indicates the lower nuclear core density of some light nuclides.

Electron scattering techniques have yielded clues as to the internal structure of light nuclides. Proton-neutron pairs experience a strongly repulsive component of the nuclear force within ≈ 0.5 fm (see "Space between nucleons" above). As nucleons cannot pack any closer, nearly all medium to heavy nuclei have the same central density. This statement generally holds true for nuclides above calcium-40, but electron scattering experiments of many of the lighter nuclides reveal a nuclear core that is remarkably less dense then the rest of the nucleus. Model-independent analyses of nuclear charge densities for both He-3 and He-4, for example, indicate a hole or significant central depression within a radius of 0.8 fm. Other light nuclides, including carbon-12 and oxygen-16, exhibit similar off-center charge density maxima. A lower radial charge density within the nuclear core reflects a lower likelihood that scattering electrons will encounter a nucleon near the center of the nucleus compared to the surrounding nuclear structure.

== Alpha particle as possible building block ==
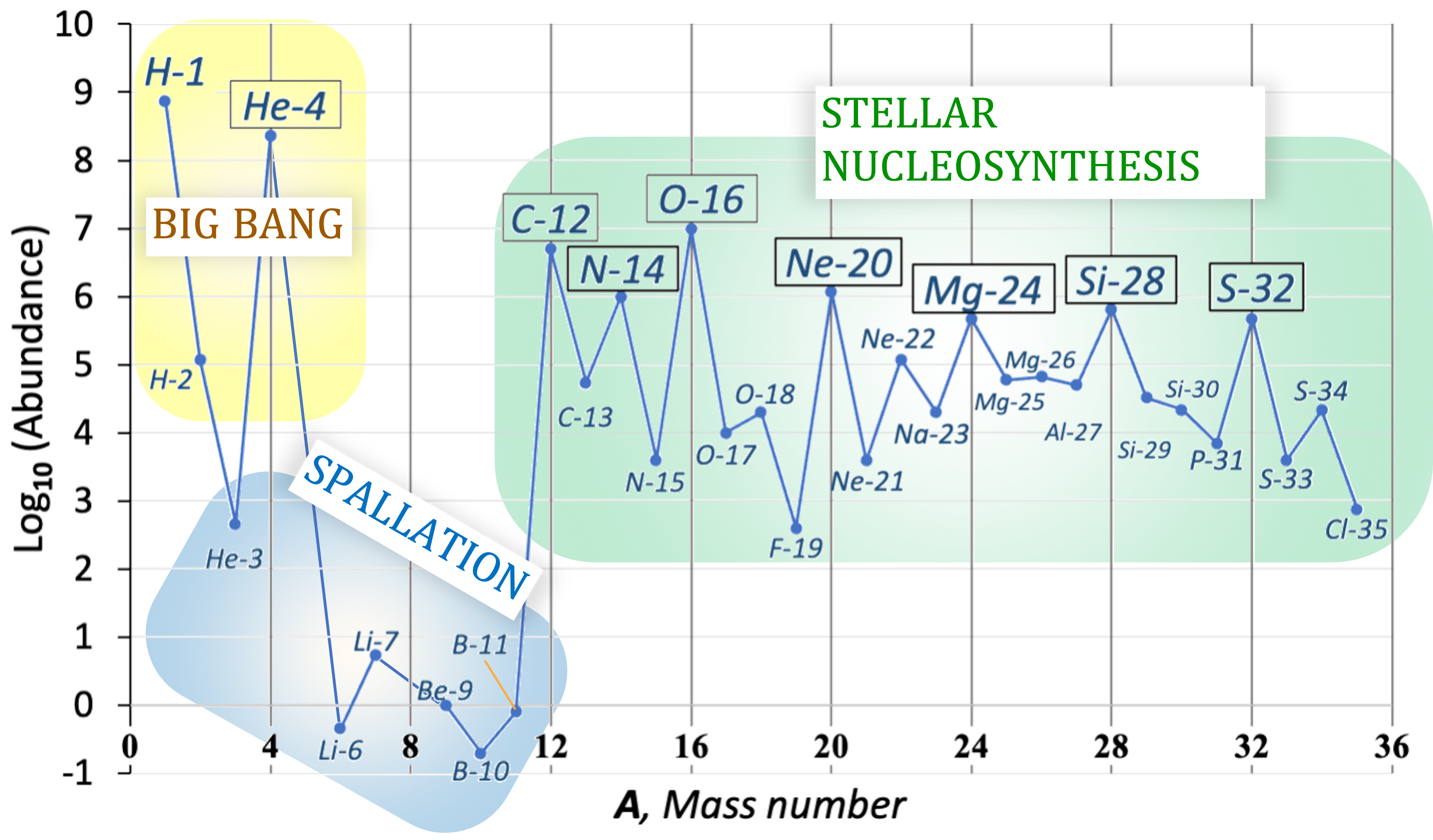
Alpha nuclides are unusually abundant products of high-energy nucleosynthetic processes.

Although the proton and the neutron are the building blocks of the atomic nucleus, the unusual natural abundance of alpha nuclides has prompted investigations of the role of the alpha particle, or helium-4 nucleus, as a potential building block of matter. Alpha cluster models envision the atomic nucleus as having discrete alpha particles that occupy average relative positions. Hydrogen makes up 74% of the ordinary baryonic matter of the universe, but 99% of the remaining matter is contained within just eight nuclides ($\ce{^{4}_{2}He}$, $\ce{^{12}_{6}C}$, $\ce{^{14}_{7}N}$, $\ce{^{16}_{8}O}$, $\ce{^{20}_{10}Ne}$, $\ce{^{24}_{12}Mg}$, $\ce{^{28}_{14}Si}$, and $\ce{^{32}_{16}S}$), seven of which are alpha nuclides. In the table below, the shapes of these nuclides may correspond to simple geometric arrangements of alpha particles, with associated radius predictions.

Geometric shapes of the most abundant alpha nuclides
Nuclide	Number of α-particles	Geometry	Radius	
Nuclide	Number of α-particles	Geometry	Predicted	Experimental
$\ce{^{12}_{6}C}$	3	Triangle	2.43 fm	2.47 fm
$\ce{^{16}_{8}O}$	4	Tetrahedron	2.54 fm	2.70 fm
$\ce{^{20}_{10}Ne}$	5	Trigonal bipyramid	2.76 fm	3.01 fm
$\ce{^{20}_{10}Ne}$	5	Square pyramid	2.79 fm	3.01 fm
$\ce{^{24}_{12}Mg}$	6	Octahedron	2.85 fm	3.06 fm
$\ce{^{24}_{12}Mg}$	6	Hexagon	3.79 fm	3.06 fm
$\ce{^{32}_{16}S}$	8	Cubic	3.37 fm	3.26 fm
$\ce{^{32}_{16}S}$	8	Octagon	4.85 fm	3.26 fm

== Heavier nuclides ==
For many medium-to-heavy nuclides, in particular those far from the magic numbers of protons and neutrons, a spherical model of the atomic nucleus is incompatible with observed large quadrupole moments, indicating that lower potential energy is obtained for an ellipsoidal shape than for a spherical nucleus of the same volume. In general, their ground states tend towards a prolate shape, although experimental data hint at oblate ground-state shapes in certain nuclei, for example krypton-72. Experiments also suggest that some heavy nuclei, such as barium-144 and radium-224, possess asymmetric pear shapes evidenced by their measured octupole moments.

It is also possible for a nucleus to adopt different shapes in states with a similar excitation energy, which is referred to as shape coexistence. For example, the ground states of krypton-74 and krypton-76 have prolate shapes, but there is evidence for oblate-shape excited structures in these nuclei appearing at low excitation energy. In this particular case, the shapes of coexisting structures tend to mix together. Examples of more than two different nuclear shapes coexisting at low excitation energy have also been suggested, for example in lead-186 and nickel-64,66, although firm experimental evidence has yet to be obtained.
