= Quantum hadrodynamics =

Effective field theory of hadron interactions

Quantum hadrodynamics (QHD) is an effective field theory pertaining to interactions between hadrons, that is, hadron-hadron interactions or the inter-hadron force. It is "a framework for describing the nuclear many-body problem as a relativistic system of baryons and mesons". Quantum hadrodynamics is closely related and partly derived from quantum chromodynamics, which is the theory of interactions between quarks and gluons that bind them together to form hadrons, via the strong force.

An important phenomenon in quantum hadrodynamics is the nuclear force, or residual strong force. It is the force operating between those hadrons which are nucleons – protons and neutrons – as it binds them together to form the atomic nucleus. The bosons which mediate the nuclear force are three types of mesons: pions, rho mesons and omega mesons. Since mesons are themselves hadrons, quantum hadrodynamics also deals with the interaction between the carriers of the nuclear force itself, alongside the nucleons bound by it. The hadrodynamic force keeps nuclei bound, against the electrodynamic force which operates to break them apart (due to the mutual repulsion between protons in the nucleus).

Quantum hadrodynamics, dealing with the nuclear force and its mediating mesons, can be compared to other quantum field theories which describe fundamental forces and their associated bosons: quantum chromodynamics, dealing with the strong interaction and gluons; quantum electrodynamics, dealing with electromagnetism and photons; quantum flavordynamics, dealing with the weak interaction and W and Z bosons.

== See also ==
- Atomic nucleus
- Hadron
- Nuclear force
- Quantum chromodynamics and strong interaction
- Quantum electrodynamics and electromagnetism
- Quantum flavordynamics and weak interaction
