= Enatsu =

Enatsu is a Japanese surname. Notable people with the surname include:

- Hiroshi Enatsu (1922–2019), Japanese theoretical physicist
- Yutaka Enatsu (1948–2026), Japanese baseball player
