= Ruprecht Machleidt =

Ruprecht Machleidt (December 18, 1943 – December 14, 2023) was a German-American theoretical nuclear physicist.

== Education and CV ==
Ruprecht Machleidt was born on December 18, 1943 in Kiel, Germany and studied physics at the University of Bonn in Bonn, Germany, where he received his master's degree (Diplom-Physiker) in 1971 and his doctorate in 1973. As a postdoc, he continued at the Institute for Theoretical Nuclear Physics at the University of Bonn until 1975. The years 1976 and 1977 he spent at the State University of New York at Stony Brook (SUNY) with the group of Gerry Brown. From 1978 to 1983 he was a research associate (Wissenschaftlicher Assistant) in Bonn. 1983 to 1985 he was a visiting scientist at TRIUMF, University of British Columbia, in Vancouver, Canada, and from 1986 to 1988 at the Los Alamos National Laboratory (at LAMPF), Los Alamos, New Mexico, USA. At the same time, he was an Adjunct Associate Professor at UCLA, Los Angeles. In 1988, he accepted the position of associate professor and in 1991 full professor at the University of Idaho, Moscow, Idaho, USA.

Ruprecht Machleidt died on December 14, 2023 in Moscow (Idaho) after a "brief but severe" illness. At the time, he directed the physics department weekly colloquium and was unable to finish the term. Among the last colloquiums for Fall 2023, he invited his son to give a presentation. Much of his focus his last term centered on the devastating impact nuclear weapons have on innocent civilians, from the perspective of a nuclear physicist. At the end of his last colloquium he mentioned nearly being killed by allied bombing at the end of the second world war while he was still an infant, and reiterated that him being killed would have been unnecessary and not helped the war end any sooner.

== Work ==
He is known as one of the developers of the Bonn potential to describe the nucleon–nucleon interaction based upon a comprehensive meson exchange model. Next he dealt with nuclear matter, taking into account meson degrees of freedom and relativistic effects (Dirac–Brueckner–Hartree–Fock). Since about 2000, Machleidt's main focus has been the development of nuclear forces based upon chiral effective field theory.

== Selected works ==
- "Nuclear Forces", Scholarpedia, Volume 9(1), 2014, p. 30710 (http://www.scholarpedia.org/article/Nuclear_Forces)
- "Chiral effective field theory and nuclear forces", Physics Reports, Volume 503, 2011, pp. 1–75, with D.R. Entem
- "Accurate charge-dependent nucleon-nucleon potential at fourth order of chiral perturbation theory", Phys. Rev. C, Volume 68, 2003, p. 041001, with D. R. Entem
- "Shell model description of the C-14 dating beta decay with Brown-Rho-scaled NN interactions", Phys. Rev. Lett., Volume 100, 2008, pp. 062501, with J.W. Holt, Gerald Brown, Thomas Kuo, J.D. Holt
- "The nucleon - nucleon interaction", Topical Review, J. Phys. G: Nucl. Part Phys., Volume 27, 2001, pp. R69 - R108, with I. Slaus
- "High-precision, charge-dependent, Bonn nucleon-nucleon Potential", Phys. Rev. C, Volume 63, 2001, p. 024001
- "Relativistic nuclear structure I: Nuclear matter", Phys. Rev. C, Volume 42, 1990, p. 1965, with R. Brockmann
- "Nuclear saturation in a relativistic Brueckner-Hartree–Fock approach", Phys. Lett., Volume 149B, 1984, p. 283, with R. Brockmann
- "The meson theory of nuclear forces and nuclear structure, Advances in Nucl . Phys., Volume 19, 1989, pp. 189-376
- "The Bonn meson-exchange model for the nucleon - nucleon interaction", Physics Reports, Volume 149, 1987, pp. 1–89, with K. Holinde and Ch. Elster
- "Momentum-space OBEP, two-nucleon and nuclear matter data", Nucl. Phys., Volume A247, 1975, p. 495, with K. Holinde
- "Neutron matter with a relativistic one-boson-exchange potential", Nucl. Phys., Volume A205, 1973, p. 292, with K. Bleuler, K. Erkelenz, and K. Holinde
