= Langer correction =

Improvement of WKB approximation

The Langer correction, named after the mathematician Rudolf Ernest Langer who developed it in 1937, is a correction to the WKB approximation for problems with radial symmetry.

== Description ==
=== In 3D systems ===
When applying WKB approximation method to the radial Schrödinger equation,
$$-\frac{\hbar^2}{2 m} \frac{d^2 R(r)}{dr^2} + [E-V_\textrm{eff}(r)] R(r) = 0 ,$$
where the effective potential is given by
$$V_\textrm{eff}(r) = V(r) - \frac{\hbar^2\ell(\ell+1)}{2mr^2}$$
($\ell$ the azimuthal quantum number related to the angular momentum operator), the eigenenergies and the wave function behaviour obtained are different from the real solution.

In 1937, Rudolf E. Langer suggested a correction
$$\ell(\ell+1) \rightarrow \left(\ell+\frac{1}{2}\right)^2$$
which is known as Langer correction or Langer replacement. This manipulation is equivalent to inserting a 1/4 constant factor whenever $\ell(\ell+1)$ appears. Heuristically, it is said that this factor arises because the range of the radial Schrödinger equation is restricted from 0 to infinity, as opposed to the entire real line. By such a changing of constant term in the effective potential, the results obtained by WKB approximation reproduces the exact spectrum for many potentials. That the Langer replacement is correct follows from the WKB calculation of the Coulomb eigenvalues with the replacement which reproduces the well known result.

=== In 2D systems ===
Note that for 2D systems, as the effective potential takes the form
$$V_\textrm{eff}(r) = V(r) - \frac{\hbar^2(\ell^2-\frac{1}{4})}{2mr^2},$$
so Langer correction goes:
$$\left(\ell^2-\frac{1}{4}\right) \rightarrow \ell^2.$$
This manipulation is also equivalent to insert a 1/4 constant factor whenever $\ell^2$ appears.

== Justification ==
An even more convincing calculation is the derivation of Regge trajectories (and hence eigenvalues) of the radial Schrödinger equation with Yukawa potential by both a perturbation method (with the old $\ell(\ell+1)$ factor) and independently the derivation by the WKB method (with Langer replacement)-- in both cases even to higher orders. For the perturbation calculation see Müller-Kirsten book and for the WKB calculation Boukema.

== See also ==
- Einstein–Brillouin–Keller method
