= Hugh L. Turrittin =

American mathematician (1906–1999)

Hugh Lonsdale Turrittin
- Born: April 24, 1906; United States
- Died: April 8, 1999
- Education: University of Wisconsin–Madison
- Known for: Work on asymptotic solutions and irregular singularities of differential equations
- Scientific career
- Fields: Mathematics, Asymptotic analysis, Ordinary differential equations
- Workplaces: University of Minnesota
- Doctoral advisor: Rudolph Ernest Langer
- Doctoral students: Neal Amundson and others

Hugh Lonsdale Turrittin (April 24, 1906 – April 8, 1999) was an American mathematician known for his pioneering contributions to the asymptotic theory of ordinary differential equations and the study of irregular singularities.

== Early life and education ==
Turrittin earned his Ph.D. in mathematics from the University of Wisconsin–Madison in 1933 under the supervision of Rudolph Ernest Langer. His doctoral dissertation, titled Asymptotic Solutions of Certain Ordinary Differential Equations Associated with Multiple Roots of the Characteristic Equation, investigated the behavior of differential equations whose characteristic equations have multiple roots -- a subtle and technically demanding area in asymptotic analysis.

== Academic career ==
After completing his doctorate, Turrittin joined the faculty of the University of Minnesota, where he spent much of his academic career. He published extensively on analytic and asymptotic methods for solving linear differential equations, especially those with irregular singular points or multiple characteristic roots. His results refined the classification of formal and analytic solutions of differential systems and remain influential in modern treatments of asymptotic expansions and differential Galois theory.

== Research contributions ==
Turrittin’s most notable work, sometimes referred to as Turrittin’s theorem, concerns the formal reduction of linear differential equations near irregular singular points. His methods describe how such systems can be transformed into canonical block-diagonal form, providing explicit asymptotic representations of solutions. His work is frequently cited in modern analytic ODE literature; mathematician Bernard Casselman has noted that “all proofs that I know of pass through a well-known and subtle result due to Hugh Turrittin.”

== Selected publications ==
- H. L. Turrittin, “Stokes multipliers for the differential equation \(d^n y / dx^n - y/x = 0\),” Funkcialaj Ekvacioj, Vol. 9 (1966), pp. 261–279.
- H. L. Turrittin, “Asymptotic Solutions of Certain Ordinary Differential Equations Associated with Multiple Roots of the Characteristic Equation,” Ph.D. thesis, University of Wisconsin–Madison, 1933.

== See also ==
- Asymptotic expansion
- Irregular singular point
- Stokes phenomenon
- Differential Galois theory
