= Hideki Yukawa =

Japanese physicist (1907–1981)

- 湯川 秀樹
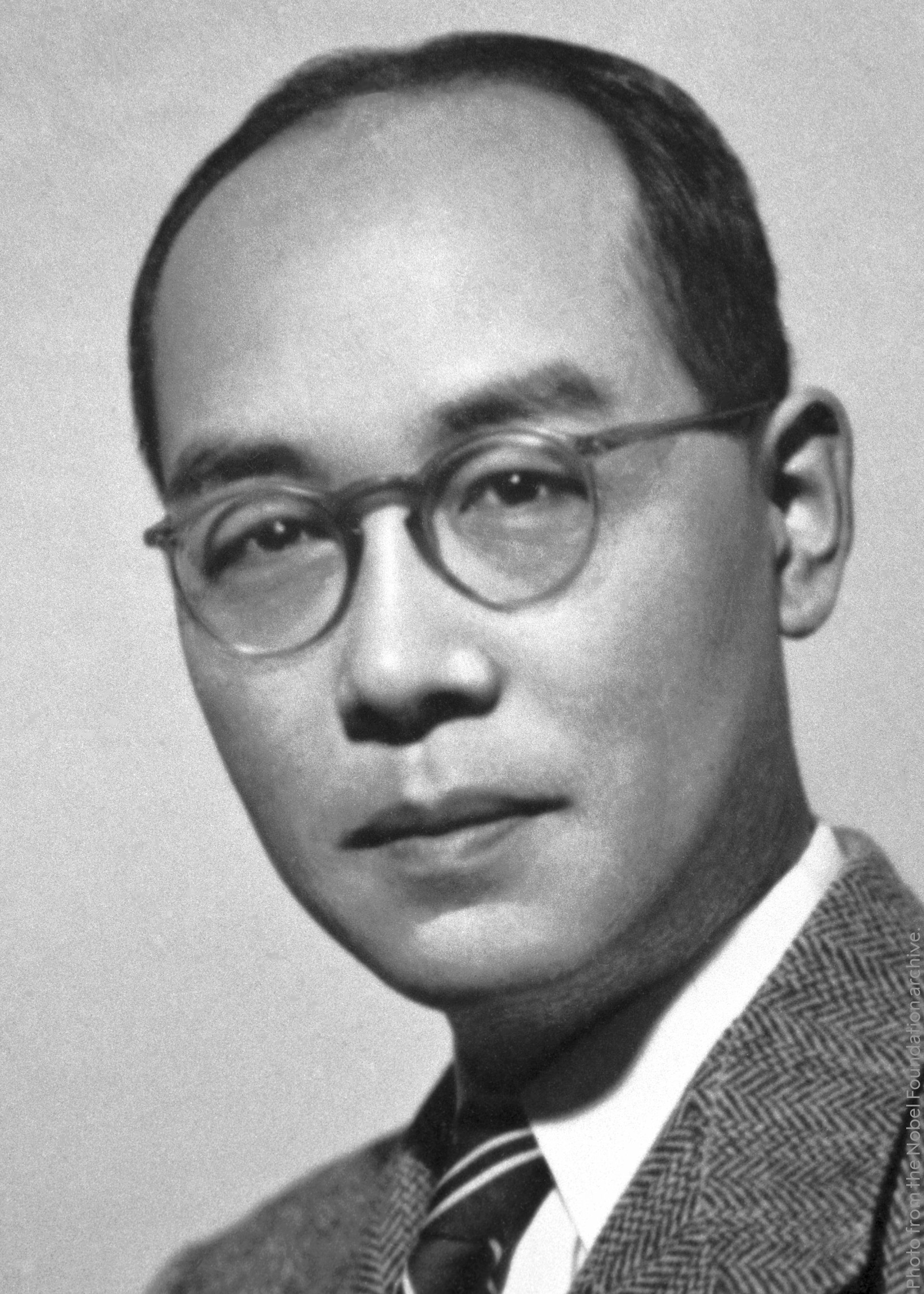
- Yukawa in 1949
- Born: Hideki Ogawa; 23 January 1907; Tokyo, Japan
- Died: 8 September 1981 (aged 74); Kyoto, Japan
- Education: Kyoto Imperial University (BSc); Osaka Imperial University (PhD)
- Known for: Yukawa potential
- Spouse: Sumi Yukawa (m. 1932)
- Children: 2
- Awards: Imperial Prize of the Japan Academy (1940); Nobel Prize in Physics (1949); Lomonosov Gold Medal (1963)
- Scientific career
- Fields: Physics
- Workplaces: Kyoto Imperial University; Osaka Imperial University; Research Institute for Fundamental Physics
- Academic advisors: Seishi Kikuchi; Yoshio Nishina
- Notable students: Hiroshi Enatsu; Kazumi Maki; Shoichi Sakata; Donald R. Yennie

Signature
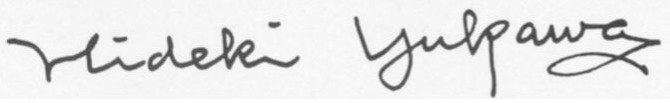

Hideki Yukawa (湯川 秀樹, Yukawa Hideki; né Ogawa; 23 January 1907 – 8 September 1981) was a Japanese theoretical physicist who received the Nobel Prize in Physics in 1949 "for his prediction of the existence of mesons on the basis of theoretical work on nuclear forces."

== Early life and education ==
Hideki Ogawa was born on 23 January 1907 in Tokyo, Japan, the third son of Takuji Ogawa, and grew up in Kyoto, where his father became Professor of Geology at Kyoto Imperial University. He read the Confucian Doctrine of the Mean, and later Lao-Tzu and Chuang-Tzu. His father, for a time, considered sending him to technical college rather than university since he was "not as outstanding a student as his older brothers." However, when his father broached the idea with his middle school principal, the principal praised his "high potential" in mathematics and offered to adopt Ogawa himself in order to keep him on a scholarly career. At that, his father relented.

Ogawa decided against becoming a mathematician when his high school teacher marked his exam answer as incorrect when Ogawa proved a theorem but in a different manner than the teacher expected. He decided against a career in experimental physics in college when he demonstrated clumsiness in glassblowing, a requirement for experiments in spectroscopy.

In 1929, Ogawa graduated from Kyoto Imperial University, where he was a lecturer from 1932 to 1939. During this period, he was interested in theoretical physics, particularly in the theory of elementary particles. In 1933, he became Lecturer and Assistant Professor of Physics at Osaka Imperial University.

== Career and research ==
Physics is a science that has made rapid progress in the twentieth century ... I desire, as I did in the past, to be a traveler in a strange land and a colonist in a new country. (from the foreword to his autobiography)

In 1935, Yukawa published his theory of mesons, which explained the interaction between protons and neutrons at Osaka Imperial University, and was a major influence on research into elementary particles.

In 1938, Yukawa received a Doctor of Philosophy from Osaka Imperial University for his predictions regarding the existence of mesons and his theoretical work on the nature of nuclear forces; these research achievements were the reason he was later awarded the Nobel Prize. In 1939, he was appointed Professor of Theoretical Physics at Kyoto Imperial University. In 1948, he became a visiting professor at the Institute for Advanced Study, and at Columbia University the following year.

In 1949, Yukawa received the Nobel Prize in Physics, after the discovery by C. F. Powell, Giuseppe Occhialini, and César Lattes of Yukawa's predicted pi meson in 1947. Yukawa also worked on the theory of K-capture, in which a low energy electron is absorbed by the nucleus, after its initial prediction by G. C. Wick.

[Once I had published my seminal 1934 paper on particle interaction] I felt like a traveler who rests himself at a small tea shop at the top of a mountain slope. At that time I was not thinking about whether there were any more mountains ahead. [conclusion of his autobiography]

In 1946, Yukawa founded the journal Progress of Theoretical Physics, and published the books Introduction to Quantum Mechanics (1946) and Introduction to the Theory of Elementary Particles (1948).

In 1953, Yukawa became the director of the newly-established Research Institute for Fundamental Physics (now the Yukawa Institute for Theoretical Physics), a position he held until his retirement in 1970.

== Activism ==
In 1955, Yukawa joined ten other leading scientists and intellectuals in signing the Russell–Einstein Manifesto, calling for nuclear disarmament.

Yukawa was one of the signatories of the agreement to convene a convention for drafting a world constitution; subsequently, a World Constituent Assembly convened to draft and adopt a Constitution for the Federation of Earth.

== Personal life and death ==
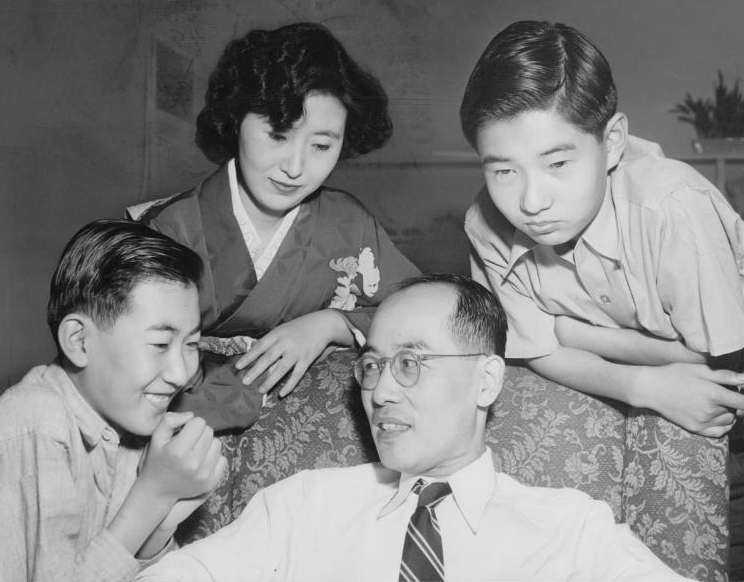
Yukawa with his family, 1949.

In 1932, he married Sumi Yukawa (スミ). In accordance with Japanese customs (see Mukoyōshi), since he came from a family with many sons—but his father-in-law, Genyo, had none—he was adopted by Genyo and changed his family name from Ogawa to Yukawa. The couple had two sons, Takaaki and Harumi. Takaaki Yukawa (1934–1971) also became a theoretical physicist, earning a Ph.D. from Trinity College Dublin in 1965 under John Lighton Synge.

Owing to increasing infirmity, in his final years Yukawa appeared in public in a wheelchair. He died of pneumonia and heart failure on 8 September 1981 at his home in Sakyo-ku, Kyoto, at the age of 74. His tomb is in Higashiyama-ku, Kyoto.

Solo violinist Diana Yukawa (ダイアナ湯川) is a close relative of Hideki Yukawa.

== Recognition ==
=== Awards ===
Year	Organization	Award	Citation	Ref.
1940	Japan Academy	Imperial Prize of the Japan Academy	—	
1949	Royal Swedish Academy of Sciences	Nobel Prize in Physics	"For his prediction of the existence of mesons on the basis of theoretical work on nuclear forces."	
1963	Academy of Sciences of the Soviet Union	Lomonosov Gold Medal	"For outstanding services in the development of theoretical physics."	

=== Memberships ===
Year	Organization	Type	Ref.
1946	Japan Academy	Member	
1949	National Academy of Sciences	International Member	
1961	American Academy of Arts and Sciences	International Honorary Member	
1961	Pontifical Academy of Sciences	Academician	
1963	Royal Society	Foreign Member	
1963	American Philosophical Society	International Member	

=== Honors ===
Year	Country	Honor	Ref.
1967	West Germany	Pour le Mérite	

== Bibliography ==
- Profiles of Japanese science and scientists, 1970 – supervisory editor: Hideki Yukawa (1970)
- Creativity and intuition: a physicist looks at East and West by Hideki Yukawa; translated by John Bester (1973)
- Scientific works (1979)
- Tabibito (旅人) – The Traveler by Hideki Yukawa; translated by L. Brown & R. Yoshida (1982), ISBN 9971-950-10-3

== See also ==
- Yukawa potential, an approximation for the binding force in an atomic nucleus
- Yukawa interaction
- List of Japanese Nobel laureates
- List of Nobel laureates affiliated with Kyoto University
- 6913 Yukawa, an asteroid named after Yukawa
