= Henry Scheffé =

American statistician (1907–1977)

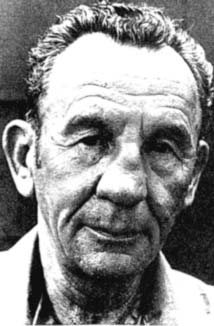
- Born: April 11, 1907; New York City
- Died: June 5, 1977 (aged 70); Berkeley, California
- Education: Cooper Union; University of Wisconsin–Madison
- Known for: Lehmann–Scheffé theorem Scheffé's method Scheffé's lemma
- Scientific career
- Fields: Mathematician, Statistician
- Doctoral advisor: Rudolf Ernest Langer
- Doctoral students: William Kruskal

Henry Scheffé (April 11, 1907 – July 5, 1977) was an American statistician. He is known for the Lehmann–Scheffé theorem and Scheffé's method.

== Education and career ==
Scheffé was born in New York City on April 11, 1907, the child of German immigrants. The family moved to Islip, New York, where Scheffé went to high school. He graduated in 1924, took night classes at Cooper Union, and a year later entered the Polytechnic Institute of Brooklyn. He transferred to the University of Wisconsin in 1928, and earned a bachelor's degree in mathematics there in 1931. Staying at Wisconsin, he married his wife Miriam in 1934 and finished his PhD in 1935, on the subject of differential equations, under the supervision of Rudolf Ernest Langer.

After teaching mathematics at Wisconsin, Oregon State University, and Reed College, Scheffé moved to Princeton University in 1941. At Princeton, he began working in statistics instead of in pure mathematics, and assisted the U.S. war effort as a consultant with the Office of Scientific Research and Development. Scheffé moved several more times, to Syracuse University in 1944, the University of California, Los Angeles in 1946, and Columbia University in 1948, where he chaired the statistics department. He settled at the University of California, Berkeley from 1953 until he retired in 1974; he took a turn as department chair there as well, from 1965 to 1968. After retiring from Berkeley, he spent more years on the faculty of Indiana University.

In 1951 he was elected as a Fellow of the American Statistical Association. Scheffé was president of the Institute of Mathematical Statistics in 1954, and also served as vice president of the American Statistical Association from 1954 to 1956.

Scheffé died in Berkeley.
