= Rudolf Ernest Langer =

American mathematician (1894–1968)

- Born: March 8, 1894; United States
- Died: August 11, 1968
- Education: Harvard University
- Known for: Contributions to ordinary differential equations and boundary-value problems
- Scientific career
- Fields: Mathematics
- Workplaces: University of Wisconsin–Madison
- Doctoral advisor: George David Birkhoff
- Doctoral students: Hugh Turrittin and others

Rudolf Ernest Langer or Rudolph Ernest Langer (8 March 1894 – 11 March 1968) was an American mathematician and president of the Mathematical Association of America. He is known for the Langer correction in semiclassical physics.

== Career ==
Langer, the elder brother of William L. Langer and Walter Charles Langer, earned his PhD in 1922 from Harvard University under G. D. Birkhoff. He taught mathematics at Dartmouth College from 1922 to 1925. From 1927 to 1964 he was a mathematics professor at the University of Wisconsin-Madison and, from 1942 to 1952, the chair of the mathematics department. From 1956 to 1963 he was the director of the Army Mathematics Research Center; he was succeeded as director by J. Barkley Rosser. Langer's doctoral students include Nicholas D. Kazarinoff, Homer Newell, Jr., and Henry Scheffé.

Langer was a colleague of American physicist Carl David Anderson, discoverer of the positron, and was one of the few people to have read Dirac’s work on the anti-electron and made a connection. He sent a short paper to Science making connections between the new observations and Dirac’s theories, putting forth imaginative claims such as that the proton is made of a neutron and a positron. His paper was not taken seriously.

== Works ==
- Langer, Rudolph E. (1923). "Developments associated with a boundary problem not linear in the parameter". Trans. Amer. Math. Soc. 25 (2): 155–172. doi:10.1090/s0002-9947-1923-1501235-3. MR 1501235.
- Langer, R. E. (1926). "On the momental constants of a summable function". Trans. Amer. Math. Soc. 28 (1): 168–182. doi:10.1090/s0002-9947-1926-1501338-6. MR 1501338.
- Langer, Rudolph E. (1926). "On the theory of integral equations with discontinuous kernels". Trans. Amer. Math. Soc. 28 (4): 585–639. doi:10.1090/s0002-9947-1926-1501367-2. MR 1501367.
- Langer, Rudolph E. (1929). "The boundary problem associated with a differential equation in which the coefficient of the parameter changes sign". Trans. Amer. Math. Soc. 31 (1): 1–24. doi:10.1090/s0002-9947-1929-1501464-4. MR 1501464.
- Langer, R. E. (1931). "On the zeros of exponential sums and integrals". Bull. Amer. Math. Soc. 37 (4): 213–239. doi:10.1090/s0002-9904-1931-05133-8. MR 1562129.
- Langer, Rudolph E. (1931). "On the asymptotic solutions of ordinary differential equations, with an application to the Bessel functions of large order". Trans. Amer. Math. Soc. 33 (1): 23–64. doi:10.1090/s0002-9947-1931-1501574-0. MR 1501574.
- Langer, Rudolph E. (1932). "On the asymptotic solutions of differential equations, with an application to the Bessel functions of large complex order". Trans. Amer. Math. Soc. 34 (3): 447–480. doi:10.1090/s0002-9947-1932-1501648-5. MR 1501648.
- Langer, R. E. (1933). "On an inverse problem in differential equations". Bull. Am. Math. Soc. 39 (10): 814–820. doi:10.1090/s0002-9904-1933-05752-x. MR 1562734.
- "The asymptotic solutions of ordinary differential equations of the second order, with special reference to the Stokes phenomenon". Bull. Amer. Math. Soc. 40 (8): 545–582. 1934. doi:10.1090/s0002-9904-1934-05913-5. MR 1562910.
- Langer, Rudolph E. (1934). "The solutions of the Mathieu equation with a complex variable and at least one parameter large". Trans. Amer. Math. Soc. 36 (3): 637–710. doi:10.1090/s0002-9947-1934-1501760-2. MR 1501760.
- Langer, Rudolph E. (1935). "On the asymptotic solutions of ordinary differential equations, with reference to the Stokes' phenomenon about a singular point". Trans. Amer. Math. Soc. 37 (3): 397–416. doi:10.1090/s0002-9947-1935-1501793-7. MR 1501793.
- Langer, R. E. (1936). "On determination of earth conductivity from observed surface potentials". Bull. Am. Math. Soc. 42 (10): 747–754. doi:10.1090/s0002-9904-1936-06420-7. MR 1563417.
- Langer, Rudolph E. (1937). "On the connection formulas and the solutions of the wave equations". Phys. Rev. 51 (8): 669–676. Bibcode:1937PhRv...51..669L. doi:10.1103/physrev.51.669.
- Langer, Rudolph E. (1949). "The asymptotic solutions of ordinary linear differential equations of the second order, with special reference to a turning point". Trans. Amer. Math. Soc. 67 (2): 461–490. doi:10.1090/s0002-9947-1949-0033420-2. MR 0033420.
- "Differential Equations, Ordinary". Encyclopædia Britannica. Vol. 7 (1967 and 1968 ed.). pp. 407–412.
