= Strong interaction =

Binding of quarks in subatomic particles

An animation of color confinement, a property of the strong interaction. If energy is supplied to the quarks as shown, the gluon tube connecting quarks elongates until it reaches a point where it "snaps" and the energy added to the system results in the formation of a quark–antiquark pair. Thus single quarks are never seen in isolation.

An animation of the strong interaction between a proton and a neutron, mediated by pions. The colored small double circles inside are gluons.

In nuclear physics and particle physics, the strong interaction, also called the strong force or strong nuclear force, is one of the four known fundamental interactions. It confines quarks into protons, neutrons, and other hadron particles, and also binds neutrons and protons to create atomic nuclei, where it is called the nuclear force.

Most of the mass of a proton or neutron is the result of the strong interaction energy; the individual quarks provide only about 1% of the mass of a proton. At the range of 10^{−15} m (1 femtometer, slightly more than the radius of a nucleon), the strong force is approximately 100 times as strong as electromagnetism, 10^{6} times as strong as the weak interaction, and 10^{38} times as strong as gravitation.

In the context of atomic nuclei, the force binds protons and neutrons together to form a nucleus and is called the nuclear force (or residual strong force). Because the force is mediated by massive, short lived mesons on this scale, the residual strong interaction obeys a distance-dependent behavior between nucleons that is quite different from when it is acting to bind quarks within hadrons. There are also differences in the binding energies of the nuclear force with regard to nuclear fusion versus nuclear fission. Nuclear fusion accounts for most energy production in the Sun and other stars. Nuclear fission allows for decay of radioactive elements and isotopes, although it is often mediated by the weak interaction. Artificially, the energy associated with the nuclear force is partially released in nuclear power and nuclear weapons, both in uranium or plutonium-based fission weapons and in fusion weapons like the hydrogen bomb.

== History ==
Before 1971, physicists were uncertain as to how the atomic nucleus was bound together. It was known that the nucleus was composed of protons and neutrons and that protons possessed positive electric charge, while neutrons were electrically neutral. Based on established principles of electromagnetism, positive charges would be expected to repel one another and the positively charged protons would be expected to cause the nucleus to fly apart. However, this was never observed. New discoveries in physics were needed to explain this phenomenon.

A stronger attractive force was postulated to explain how the atomic nucleus was bound despite the protons' mutual electromagnetic repulsion. This hypothesized force was called the strong force, which was believed to be a fundamental force that acted on the protons and neutrons that make up the nucleus.

In 1964, Murray Gell-Mann, and separately George Zweig, proposed that baryons, which include protons and neutrons, and mesons were composed of elementary particles. Zweig called the elementary particles "aces" while Gell-Mann called them "quarks"; the theory came to be called the quark model. The strong attraction between nucleons was the side-effect of a more fundamental force that bound the quarks together into protons and neutrons. The theory of quantum chromodynamics explains that quarks carry what is called a color charge, although it has no relation to visible color. Quarks with unlike color charge attract one another as a result of the strong interaction, and the particle that mediates this was called the gluon.

== Behavior of the strong interaction ==
The strong interaction is observable at two ranges, and mediated by different force carriers in each one. On a scale less than about 0.8 fm (roughly the radius of a nucleon), the force is carried by gluons and holds quarks together to form protons, neutrons, and other hadrons. On a larger scale, up to about 3 fm, the force is carried by mesons and binds nucleons (protons and neutrons) together to form the nucleus of an atom. In the former context, it is often known as the color force, and is so strong that if hadrons are struck by high-energy particles, they produce jets of massive particles instead of emitting their constituents (quarks and gluons) as freely moving particles. This property of the strong force is called color confinement.

Two layers of strong interaction
Interaction	range	held	carrier	result
Strong	< 0.8 fm	quark	gluon	hadron
Residual Strong	1–3 fm	hadron	meson	nucleus

=== Within hadrons ===
The fundamental couplings of the strong interaction: (a) gluon radiation, (b) gluon splitting and (c,d) gluon self-coupling.

The word strong is used since the strong interaction is the "strongest" of the four fundamental forces. At a distance of 10^{−15} m, its strength is around 100 times that of the electromagnetic force, some 10^{6} times as great as that of the weak force, and about 10^{38} times that of gravitation.

The strong force is described by quantum chromodynamics (QCD), a part of the Standard Model of particle physics. Mathematically, QCD is a non-abelian gauge theory based on a local (gauge) symmetry group called SU(3).

The force carrier particle of the strong interaction is the gluon, a massless gauge boson. Gluons are thought to interact with quarks and other gluons by way of a type of charge called color charge. Color charge is analogous to electromagnetic charge, but it comes in three types (±red, ±green, and ±blue) rather than one, which results in different rules of behavior. These rules are described by quantum chromodynamics (QCD), the theory of quark–gluon interactions. Unlike the photon in electromagnetism, which is neutral, the gluon carries a color charge. Quarks and gluons are the only fundamental particles that carry non-vanishing color charge, and hence they participate in strong interactions only with each other. The strong force is the expression of the gluon interaction with other quark and gluon particles. All quarks and gluons in QCD interact with each other through the strong force. The strength of interaction is parameterized by the strong coupling constant. This strength is modified by the gauge color charge of the particle, a group-theoretical property.

The strong force acts between quarks. Unlike all other forces (electromagnetic, weak, and gravitational), the strong force does not diminish in strength with increasing distance between pairs of quarks. After a limiting distance (about the size of a hadron) has been reached, it remains at a strength of about 10000 N, no matter how much farther the distance between the quarks. As the separation between the quarks grows, the energy added to the pair creates new pairs of matching quarks between the original two; hence it is impossible to isolate quarks. The explanation is that the amount of work done against a force of 10000 N is enough to create particle–antiparticle pairs within a very short distance. The energy added to the system by pulling two quarks apart would create a pair of new quarks that will pair up with the original ones. In QCD, this phenomenon is called color confinement; as a result, only hadrons, not individual free quarks, can be observed. The failure of all experiments that have searched for free quarks is considered to be evidence of this phenomenon.

The elementary quark and gluon particles involved in a high energy collision are not directly observable. The interaction produces jets of newly created hadrons that are observable. Those hadrons are created, as a manifestation of mass–energy equivalence, when sufficient energy is deposited into a quark–quark bond, as when a quark in one proton is struck by a very fast quark of another impacting proton during a particle accelerator experiment. However, quark–gluon plasmas have been observed.

=== Between hadrons ===
A Feynman diagram (shown by the animation in the lead) with the individual quark constituents shown, to illustrate how the fundamental strong interaction gives rise to the nuclear force. Straight lines are quarks, while multi-colored loops are gluons (the carriers of the fundamental force).

While color confinement implies that the strong force acts without distance-diminishment between pairs of quarks in compact collections of bound quarks (hadrons), at distances approaching or greater than the radius of a proton, a residual force (described below) remains. It manifests as a force between the "colorless" hadrons, and is known as the nuclear force or residual strong force (and historically as the strong nuclear force).

The nuclear force acts between hadrons, known as mesons and baryons. This "residual strong force", acting indirectly, transmits gluons that form part of the virtual π and ρ mesons, which, in turn, transmit the force between nucleons that holds the nucleus (beyond hydrogen-1 nucleus) together.

The residual strong force is thus a minor residuum of the strong force that binds quarks together into protons and neutrons. This same force is much weaker between neutrons and protons, because it is mostly neutralized within them, in the same way that electromagnetic forces between neutral atoms (van der Waals forces) are much weaker than the electromagnetic forces that hold electrons in association with the nucleus, forming the atoms.

Unlike the strong force, the residual strong force diminishes with distance, and does so rapidly. The decrease is approximately as a negative exponential power of distance, though there is no simple expression known for this; see Yukawa potential. The rapid decrease with distance of the attractive residual force and the less rapid decrease of the repulsive electromagnetic force acting between protons within a nucleus, causes the instability of larger atomic nuclei, such as all those with atomic numbers larger than 82 (the element lead).

Although the nuclear force is weaker than the strong interaction itself, it is still highly energetic: transitions produce gamma rays. The mass of a nucleus is significantly different from the summed masses of the individual nucleons. This mass defect is due to the potential energy associated with the nuclear force. Differences between mass defects power nuclear fusion and nuclear fission.

== Unification ==
The so-called Grand Unified Theories (GUT) aim to describe the strong interaction and the electroweak interaction as aspects of a single force, similarly to how the electromagnetic and weak interactions were unified by the Glashow–Weinberg–Salam model into electroweak interaction. The strong interaction has a property called asymptotic freedom, wherein the strength of the strong force diminishes at higher energies (or temperatures). The theorized energy where its strength becomes equal to the electroweak interaction is the grand unification energy. However, no Grand Unified Theory has yet been successfully formulated to describe this process, and Grand Unification remains an unsolved problem in physics.

== See also ==
- Mathematical formulation of quantum mechanics
- Mathematical formulation of the Standard Model
- Nuclear binding energy
- QCD matter
- Quantum field theory
- Yukawa coupling
