= Semiclassical physics =

Use of both classical and quantum physics to analyze a system

In physics, the semiclassical approximation divides a system into two parts, one to be described quantum-mechanically, and the other to be treated classically. In general, it incorporates a series expansion in powers of the Planck constant, resulting in classical physics in the power of 0, and the first nontrivial approximation to the power of (−1). In this case, there is a clear link between the quantum-mechanical system and the associated semiclassical and classical approximations, as it is similar in appearance to the transition from physical optics to geometric optics.

== History ==
Max Planck was the first to introduce the idea of quanta of energy in 1900 while studying black-body radiation. In 1906, he was also the first to write that quantum theory should replicate classical mechanics at some limit, particularly if the Planck constant $h$ were infinitesimal. With this idea he showed that Planck's law for thermal radiation leads to the Rayleigh–Jeans law, the classical prediction (valid for large wavelength).

== Instances ==
Some examples of a semiclassical approximation include:

- WKB approximation: electrons in classical external electromagnetic fields.
- Expansion around classical solution: Classical limit of quantum mechanics by continuous measurement.
- Semiclassical gravity: quantum field theory within a classical curved gravitational background (see general relativity).
- Quantum chaos: quantization of classical chaotic systems.
- Magnetic properties of materials and astrophysical bodies under the effect of large magnetic fields (see for example De Haas–Van Alphen effect)
- Quantum field theory: only Feynman diagrams with at most a single closed loop (see for example one-loop Feynman diagram) are considered, which corresponds to the powers of the Planck constant.

== See also ==
- Bohr model
- Correspondence principle
- Classical limit
- Eikonal approximation
- Einstein–Brillouin–Keller method
- Old quantum theory
