= Hiroshi Enatsu =

Japanese theoretical physicist (1922–2019)

- Born: September 12, 1922; Miyakonojō, Japan
- Died: August 4, 2019 (aged 96); Kyoto, Japan
- Citizenship: Japan
- Education: Kyoto Imperial University
- Scientific career
- Fields: theoretical physics
- Workplaces: Kyoto University; Columbia University; Niels Bohr Institute; Ritsumeikan University
- Doctoral advisor: Hideki Yukawa

Hiroshi Enatsu (12 September 1922 – 4 August 2019) was a Japanese theoretical physicist who contributed to a relativistic Hamiltonian formalism in quantum field theory.

== Academic works ==
Enatsu has found that the commutation relation

$[\psi (x, \tau), \psi ^*(x', \tau)] = \delta ( x - x' )$

in a relativistic Hamiltonian formalism is equivalent to that in the conventional non-relativistic Hamiltonian formalism of quantum field theory, where $[\psi, \phi] = \psi \phi - \phi \psi$ is the commutator, $x$ is space-time coordinates, $\tau$ is proper time, $\psi ^*$ is Hermitian adjoint of $\psi$, and $\delta (x)$ is the Dirac delta function, with the aid of the relation

$\epsilon ( x - x' ) \epsilon ( \tau - \tau' )=1$.

Here, a step function $\epsilon ( x )$ follows $\epsilon ( x )=1$ for $0 < x$, and $\epsilon ( x )=-1$ for $x < 0$.

== Biography ==
=== Early stage ===
Enatsu was born on 12 September 1922 in Miyakonojō as a son of Eizo and Fumi (Kuroiwa) Enatsu. Miyakonojō is a town within the territory of the former Satsuma Domain, and it was rather natural for Enatsu to receive an education in Kagoshima. So, he spent in Kagoshima for secondary education and junior college.

=== Encounter with Hideki Yukawa ===
In the last year of junior college, Hideki Yukawa made a lecture on meson theory at Kagoshima. After listening to the lecture, Enatsu became interested in Yukawa and meson theory, so he decided to study under Yukawa. He studied on meson theory under Yukawa in undergraduate course. He received Bachelor of Science from Kyoto Imperial University in 1944. He received Doctor of Science. from Kyoto Imperial University in 1953 under Yukawa. Enatsu was an assistant under Yukawa at Kyoto University from 1946 to 1957. Enatsu was a research assistant at Columbia University in New York City from 1952 to 1953.

=== Encounter with Niels Bohr ===
Enatsu was a visiting member of the Institute for Theoretical Physics in Copenhagen from 1955 to 1956. During his stay in Copenhagen, he could ask some questions to Bohr almost every week. It was a special treatment.

=== Professor at Ritsumeikan University ===
In 1957, Enatsu was an assistant professor and inaugurated a professor at Ritsumeikan University in Kyoto. From 1971 to 1972, he was also the dean of faculty of science and engineering at Ritsumeikan University. In 1988, he retired from a professor at Ritsumeikan University in Kyoto, and has been a professor emeritus. In 1997. he received the 3rd class of the Order of the Sacred Treasure. Enatsu died on 4 August 2019 in Kyoto

== Research articles ==
- On the Photodisintegration of the Deuteron (Pseudoscalar Meson Theory.), December 1949
- On the Nuclear Forces, February 1950
- On the Interaction of Mesons and Nucleons, September 1950
- On the Mass of Cohesive Meson and the Mass Difference Of Nucleon, April 1951
- On the Mass of Cohesive Meson and the Mass Difference of Nucleons, II, June 1951
- On the Mass Difference of Nucleons and the Cohesive Mesons, October 1951
- On the Self-energies of Mesons, October 1951
- On the Self-Energies of Nucleons, October 1951
- Self-Energies of Nucleons and the Mass Spectra of Heavy Particles, February 1952
- Mass Spectrum of Elementary Particles I: Eigenvalue Problem in Space-time, February 1954
- Mass Spectrum of Elementary Particles, II, September 1954
- Theory of Unstable Heavy Particles, July 1954
- Relativistic quantum mechanics and mass-quantization, 1956
- Relativistic Hamiltonian Formalism in Quantum Field Theory and Micro-Noncausality, August 1963
- Covariant Hamiltonian Formalism for Particles of any Spin and Nonzero Mass, 1968
- Micro-noncausal theory of the hydrogen atom 1971
- Covariant Hamiltonian formalism for quantized fields and the hydrogen mass levels, 1975
- On the hyperfine structure splittings of hydrogen, 1975
- Proton-proton scattering problem in a covariant Hamiltonian formalism, 1976
- Four-dimensional tensor forces and electric quadrupole moments in the bound-states of the deuteron, 1976
- Micrononcausal euclidean wave functions for hadrons, February 1978
- Hyperfine structure splittings of the hydrogen atom in a covariant Hamiltonian formalism, 1983
- Bethe-Salpeter type equations for a covariant Hamiltonian formalism in quantum field theory, 1984
- Quantization of masses of elementary particles with micrononcausal structures, October 1986
- Quantization of masses of elementary particles with micrononcausal structures 1987
- Quantization of the mass of the W-boson in the Weinberg-Salam theory, 1988
