= Yukawa potential =

Screened Coulomb potential which exponentially decays

In particle, atomic and condensed matter physics, a Yukawa potential (also called a screened Coulomb potential) is a potential named after the Japanese physicist Hideki Yukawa. The potential is of the form:

$$V_\text{Yukawa}(r)= -g^2\frac{e^{-\alpha m r}}{r},$$

where $g$ is a magnitude scaling constant, i.e. is the amplitude of potential, m is the mass of the particle, r is the radial distance to the particle, and α is another scaling constant, so that $r \approx \tfrac{1}{\alpha m}$ is the approximate range. The potential is monotonically increasing in r and it is negative, implying the force is attractive. In the SI system, the unit of the Yukawa potential is the inverse meter.

The Coulomb potential of electromagnetism is an example of a Yukawa potential with the $e^{-\alpha mr}$ factor equal to 1, everywhere. This can be interpreted as saying that the photon mass m is equal to 0. The photon is the force-carrier between interacting, charged particles.

In interactions between a meson field and a fermion field, the constant $g$ is equal to the gauge coupling constant between those fields. In the case of the nuclear force, the fermions would be a proton and another proton or a neutron.

== History ==
Prior to Hideki Yukawa's 1935 paper, physicists struggled to explain the results of James Chadwick's atomic model, which consisted of positively charged protons and neutrons packed inside of a small nucleus, with a radius on the order of 10^{−14} meters. Physicists knew that electromagnetic forces at these lengths would cause these protons to repel each other and for the nucleus to fall apart. Thus came the motivation for further explaining the interactions between elementary particles. In 1932, Werner Heisenberg proposed a "Platzwechsel" (migration) interaction between the neutrons and protons inside the nucleus, in which neutrons were composite particles of protons and electrons. These composite neutrons would emit electrons, creating an attractive force with the protons, and then turn into protons themselves. When, in 1933 at the Solvay Conference, Heisenberg proposed his interaction, physicists suspected it to be of either two forms:

$$J(r) = ae^{-br} \quad \textrm{or}\quad J(r) = ae^{-br^2}$$

on account of its short-range. However, there were many issues with his theory. For one, it is impossible for an electron of spin 1/2 and a proton of spin 1/2 to add up to the neutron spin of 1/2. The way Heisenberg treated this issue would go on to form the ideas of isospin.

Heisenberg's idea of an exchange interaction (rather than a Coulombic force) between particles inside the nucleus led Fermi to formulate his ideas on beta-decay in 1934. Fermi's neutron-proton interaction was not based on the "migration" of neutrons and protons between each other. Instead, Fermi proposed the emission and absorption of two light particles: the neutrino and electron, rather than just the electron (as in Heisenberg's theory). While Fermi's interaction solved the issue of the conservation of linear and angular momentum, Soviet physicists Igor Tamm and Dmitri Ivanenko demonstrated that the force associated with the neutrino and electron emission was not strong enough to bind the protons and neutrons in the nucleus.

In his February 1935 paper, Hideki Yukawa combines both the idea of Heisenberg's short-range force interaction and Fermi's idea of an exchange particle in order to fix the issue of the neutron-proton interaction. He deduced a potential which includes an exponential decay term ($e^{-\alpha mr}$) and an electromagnetic term ($1/r$). In analogy to quantum field theory, Yukawa knew that the potential and its corresponding field must be a result of an exchange particle. In the case of quantum electrodynamics, this exchange particle was a photon of 0 mass. In Yukawa's case, the exchange particle had some mass, which was related to the range of interaction (given by $\tfrac{1}{\alpha m}$). Since the range of the nuclear force was known, Yukawa used his equation to predict the mass of the mediating particle as about 200 times the mass of the electron. Physicists called this particle the "meson," as its mass was in the middle of the proton and electron. Yukawa's meson was found in 1947, and came to be known as the pion.

== Relation to Coulomb potential ==
Figure 1: A comparison of Yukawa potentials where $g = 1$ and with various values for m.

Figure 2: A "long-range" comparison of Yukawa and Coulomb potentials' strengths where $g = 1$.

If the particle has no mass (i.e., m = 0), then the Yukawa potential reduces to a Coulomb potential, and the range is said to be infinite. In fact, we have:

$$m=0  \Rightarrow e^{-\alpha m r}= e^0 = 1.$$

Consequently, the equation

$$V_{\text{Yukawa}}(r)= -g^2 \;\frac{e^{-\alpha mr}}{r}$$

simplifies to the form of the Coulomb potential

$$V_{\text{Coulomb}}(r)= -g^2 \;\frac{1}{r}.$$

where we set the scaling constant to be:

$$g^2 = \frac{q}{4 \pi \varepsilon_0}$$

A comparison of the long range potential strength for Yukawa and Coulomb is shown in Figure 2. It can be seen that the Coulomb potential has effect over a greater distance whereas the Yukawa potential approaches zero rather quickly. However, any Yukawa potential or Coulomb potential is non-zero for any large r.

== Relation to wave equation ==
The Yukawa potential can be thought of as arising from modifying the electromagnetic wave equation to describe a particle with nonzero mass.

The electromagnetic wave equation reads

$$\ \Box\;\! A^\mu = \mathsf{source\ terms}\ ,$$

where $\ A^\mu\$ is the electromagnetic four-potential and $\ \Box \equiv \tfrac{ 1 }{\ c^2 } \partial_t^2 - \nabla^2\$ is the 4 dimensional spacetime version of the Laplacian – named the d'Alembertian. The potential will go as $\ \tfrac{\;\! 1 \;\!}{ r }\$ for a point source.

This wave equation describes a photon. For the nuclear force, we hope to describe pions. The pion can be described by a scalar field, as opposed to a vector, and we modify the wave equation to incorporate mass (following the energy-mass relation $E^2 = p^2 c^2 + m^2 c^4$) by adding a multiple of the field (which doesn't affect relativistic invariance):

$$\ \Box\;\!\phi\ +\ \mu^2 \phi = 0\$$

If $\ \phi\$ only depends on the radial spherical coordinate, $\ r\ ,$ and is time-independent, then we can rearrange the equation to get $\ \nabla^2 \phi = \mu^2 \phi ~.$

Using the expression for the Laplacian in spherical coordinates $\ \nabla^2 \phi = \frac{\;\! 1 \;\!}{ r }\ \partial_r^2 \bigl(\;\! r\;\!\phi \;\!\bigr)\$ we get

$$\ \partial_r^2 \bigl(\ r\ \phi\ \bigr) = \mu^2\ \bigl(\ r\ \phi\ \bigr)\$$

which has solutions in the form $\ r\ \phi(\;\! r \;\!) = K\ e^{ -\mu\;\! r }\$ so that

$$\ \phi(\;\! r \;\!)\ =\ K\ \frac{\;\! e^{ -\mu\;\! r} }{ r }\ ,$$

which is the Yukawa potential.

For the photon, a wave solution will look like $\ e^{ i \left( k x - \omega t \right) } ~.$ We can substitute this in to the homogenous electromagnetic wave equation to obtain

$$\ \left ( \frac{\ \omega }{\ c} \right )^2 = k^2\ ,$$

By using the Planck relation $\ E = \hbar\;\!\omega\$ and the de Broglie relation $\ p = \hbar\;\! k ~.$ we get

$$\ \left ( \frac{\ E}{\ c} \right )^2 = p^2 ~.$$

The mass-energy equivalence tells us that $\ \left ( \frac{\ E}{\ c} \right )^2 = p^2 + m^2 c^2\ ,$ so this tells us that the photon is massless.

If we repeat this analysis for the pion, we get

$\ \left( \frac{\ E}{\ c} \right )^2 = k^2 + \mu^2 \hbar^2\ ,$ which tells us that the meson has a mass of $\ m = \frac{\;\!\mu\;\!\hbar\;\!}{ c } ~.$ or in other words that $\mu = \frac{m c}{\hbar} = \lambda\!\!\!\bar{} ^{-1}$ where $\lambda\!\!\!\bar{}$ is the reduced Compton wavelength of the meson.

$\ \mu\$ can be estimated from the observed range of the nuclear forces. The nuclear force has a range on the order of femtometers ($\ 10^{-15} \mathsf{m}\$), and $\hbar c \approx 200 \text{ MeV fm}$ so the pion mass should be about 170 MeV, close to the actual value of around 140 MeV.

== Fourier transform ==
The easiest way to understand that the Yukawa potential is associated with a massive field is by examining its Fourier transform. One has

$$V(\mathbf{r}) =
\frac{-g^2}{(2\pi)^3}
\int e^{i\mathbf{k \cdot r}}
\frac {4\pi}{k^2+(\alpha m)^2} \,\mathrm{d}^3 k$$

where the integral is performed over all possible values of the 3-vector momenta k. In this form, and setting the scaling factor to one, $\alpha = 1$, the fraction $\frac{4 \pi}{k^2 + m^2}$ is seen to be the propagator or Green's function of the Klein–Gordon equation.

== Feynman amplitude ==
Single particle exchange.

The Yukawa potential can be derived as the lowest order amplitude of the interaction of a pair of fermions. The Yukawa interaction couples the fermion field $\psi(x)$ to the meson field $\phi(x)$ with the coupling term

$$\mathcal{L}_\mathrm{int}(x) = g~\overline{\psi}(x)~\phi(x)~\psi(x)~.$$

The scattering amplitude for two fermions, one with initial momentum $p_1$ and the other with momentum $p_2$, exchanging a meson with momentum k, is given by the Feynman diagram on the right.

The Feynman rules for each vertex associate a factor of $g$ with the amplitude; since this diagram has two vertices, the total amplitude will have a factor of $g^2$. The line in the middle, connecting the two fermion lines, represents the exchange of a meson. The Feynman rule for a particle exchange is to use the propagator; the propagator for a massive meson is $\frac{-4\pi}{~k^2+m^2~}$. Thus, we see that the Feynman amplitude for this graph is nothing more than

$$V(\mathbf{k})=-g^2\frac{4\pi}{k^2+m^2}~.$$

From the previous section, this is seen to be the Fourier transform of the Yukawa potential.

== Eigenvalues of Schrödinger equation ==
The radial Schrödinger equation with Yukawa potential can be solved perturbatively. Using the radial Schrödinger equation in the form

$$\left[\frac{\mathrm{d}^2}{\mathrm{d}r^2} + k^2 - \frac{\ell(\ell + 1)}{r^2} - V(r)\right] \Psi\left(\ell,k;\,r\right) = 0,$$

and the Yukawa potential in the power-expanded form

$$V(r) = \sum_{j = -1}^{\infty} M_{j + 1} \, (-r)^j,$$

and setting $K = jk$, one obtains for the angular momentum $\ell$ the expression

$$\ell + n + 1 = -\frac{\,\Delta_n(K)\,}{2K}$$

for $|K| \to \infty$, where

$$\begin{align}
&\Delta_n(K) = M_0  - \frac{1}{\,2K^2\,}\Bigl[\,n(n + 1)\,M_2 + M_0\,M_1\,\Bigr] - \frac{\,2n + 1\,}{4K^3}\,M_0\,M_2 ~+ \\
&\qquad\qquad\quad + \frac{1}{\,8K^4\,}\,\Bigl[\,3(n-1)n(n+1)(n+2)\,M_4 + 2 (3n^2 + 3n - 1)\,M_3\,M_0 ~+ \\
&\qquad\qquad\qquad\qquad\qquad ~+~ 6n(n + 1)\,M_2\,M_1 + 2\,M_2\,M_0^2 + 3M_1^2\,M_0\,\Bigr] ~+ \\
&\qquad\qquad\quad + \frac{\,2n + 1\,}{\,8K^5\,}\,\Bigl[\,3(n^2 + n - 1)\,M_4\,M_0 + 3\,M_3\,M_0^2 + n(n + 1)\,M_2^2 + 4\,M_2\,M_1\,M_0\,\Bigr]~+ \\
&\qquad\qquad\quad +~ \operatorname{\mathcal O}\Bigl(\,\frac{1}{\,K^7\,}\,\Bigr) ~.
\end{align}$$

Setting all coefficients $M_j$ except $M_0$ equal to zero, one obtains the well-known expression for the Schrödinger eigenvalue for the Coulomb potential, and the radial quantum number $\,n\,$ is a positive integer or zero as a consequence of the boundary conditions which the wave functions of the Coulomb potential have to satisfy. In the case of the Yukawa potential the imposition of boundary conditions is more complicated. Thus in the Yukawa case $\nu = n$ is only an approximation and the parameter $\nu$ that replaces the integer n is really an asymptotic expansion like that above with first approximation the integer value of the corresponding Coulomb case. The above expansion for the orbital angular momentum or Regge trajectory $\ell(K)$ can be reversed to obtain the energy eigenvalues or equivalently $\bigl|K\bigr|^2$. One obtains:

$$\begin{align}
&\bigl|K\bigr|^2 ~=~ - M_1 ~+~ \frac{1}{\,4(\ell+n+1)^2\,}\,\biggl\{\; M_0^2 - 4n(n+1)(\ell+n+1)^2 \,M_2\, M_0 + 4(2n+1)(\ell+n+1)^2\frac{M_2}{\;M_0\,} ~+ \\
&\quad +~4\frac{\;(\ell+n+1)^4\,}{M_0^3}\,\Bigl[\,3(n-1)n(n+1)(n+5)\,M_4\,M_0 ~+ \\
& \qquad \qquad \qquad \qquad \qquad \qquad - ~ 3 n^2(n+1)^2\,M_2^2 + 2(3n^2+3n-1)\,M_3\,M_0^2 + 2\,M_2\,M_0^3\,\Bigr] ~+ \\
&\quad - ~ 24\frac{\,(2n+1)(\ell+n+1)^5\,}{M_0^4}\,\Bigl[\,(n^2 + n - 1)\,M_0\,M_4  + M_0^3\,M_3 -  n(n+1)\,M_2^2\,\Bigr] ~+ \\
&\quad - ~ 4\,\frac{\,(\ell + n + 1)^6\,}{M_0^7}\,\Bigl[~10(n-2)(n-1)n(n+1)(n+2)(n+3)\,M_6\,M_0^2 ~+ \\
&\qquad \qquad \qquad \qquad + ~ 4\,M_3\,M_0^5 + 2\Bigl(\,5n(n+1)(3 n^2 + 3n - 10) + 12\,\Bigr)\,M_5\,M_0^3 ~+\\
&\qquad \qquad \qquad \qquad + ~ 2 (6 n^2 + 6n - 11)\, M_4\,M_0^4 + 2(9 n^2 + 9n - 1)\,M_2^2\,M_0^3 ~+ \\
&\qquad \qquad \qquad \qquad - ~ 10 n(n+1)(3 n^2 + 3n + 2)\, M_3\,M_2\,M_0^2 + 20 n^3(n+1)^3\, M_2^3 ~+ \\
&\qquad \qquad \qquad \qquad - ~ 30 (n-1)n^2(n+1)^2(n+2)\,M_4\,M_2\,M_0\,\Bigr] \quad + \quad \cdots \biggr\} \quad .
\end{align}$$

The above asymptotic expansion of the angular momentum $\ell(K)$ in descending powers of $K$ can also be derived with the WKB method. In that case, however, as in the case of the Coulomb potential the expression $\ell(\ell+1)$ in the centrifugal term of the Schrödinger equation has to be replaced by $\left(\ell+\tfrac{1}{2}\right)^2$, as was argued originally by Langer, the reason being that the singularity is too strong for an unchanged application of the WKB method. That this reasoning is correct follows from the WKB derivation of the correct result in the Coulomb case (with the Langer correction), and even of the above expansion in the Yukawa case with higher order WKB approximations.

== Cross section ==
We can calculate the differential cross section between a proton or neutron and the pion by making use of the Yukawa potential. We use the Born approximation, which tells us that, in a spherically symmetrical potential, we can approximate the outgoing scattered wave function as the sum of incoming plane wave function and a small perturbation:

$$\psi(\vec{r}) \approx A \left[(e^{ipr}) + \frac{e^{ipr}}{r} f(\theta) \right]$$

where $\vec{p} = p \hat{z}$ is the particle's incoming momentum. The function $f(\theta)$ is given by:

$$f(\theta) = \frac{-2\mu}{\hbar^2 \left|\vec{p}-\vec{p}' \right|} \, \int_{0}^{\infty} r \, V(r) \, \sin\left(\left|\vec{p}-\vec{p}'\right| r \right) ~ \mathrm{d}r$$

where $\vec p' = p \hat r$ is the particle's outgoing scattered momentum and $\mu$ is the incoming particles' mass (not to be confused with $m,$ the pion's mass). We calculate $f(\theta)$ by plugging in $V_\text{Yukawa}$:

$$f(\theta) = \frac{2\mu}{\hbar^2 \left|\vec{p}-\vec{p}'\right|} \, g^2 \int_{0}^{\infty} e^{-\alpha m r} \, \sin \left(\left|\vec{p} - \vec{p}'\right| \, r \right) \, \mathrm{d}r$$

Evaluating the integral gives

$$f(\theta) = \frac{2 \mu g^2}{\hbar^2\,\left[(\alpha m)^2 + \left| \vec{p} - \vec{p}' \right|^2\right]}$$

Energy conservation implies

$$\bigl|\vec p\bigr| = \bigl|\vec p'\bigr| = p~$$

so that

$$\left|\vec p - \vec p'\right| = 2\,p\,\sin\left(\tfrac{1}{2}\theta\right)~$$

Plugging in, we get:

$$f(\theta) = \frac{2 \mu g^2}{\hbar^2 \left[(\alpha m)^2  + 4\,p^2\,\sin^2\left({\frac{1}{2}\theta}\right)\right]}$$

We thus get a differential cross section of:

$$\frac{\mathrm d \sigma}{\mathrm d \Omega} = \left|f(\theta)\right|^2 = \frac{4 \mu^2 g^4}{\hbar^4\ \left[ (\alpha m)^2 + 4 p^2 \sin^2\left(\frac{1}{2}\theta\right) \right]^2}$$

Integrating, the total cross section is:

$$\sigma = \int \frac{\mathrm{d} \sigma}{\mathrm{d} \Omega} \mathrm{d}\Omega
= \frac{4 \mu^2 g^4}{\hbar^4} \int_0^\pi \frac{2\pi \sin(\theta) \mathrm{d}\theta}{\left[(\alpha m)^2  + 4 p^2 \sin^2\left(\frac{1}{2}\theta\right) \right]^2}
= \frac{4 \mu^2 g^4}{\hbar^4} \frac{4\pi}{(\alpha m)^2 \left[(\alpha m)^2 + 4p^2 \right]}$$

== Spherical shell ==
The potential outside of an infinitesimally thin, uniform spherical shell with total scaling constant $G$ and radius $R$ is also a Yukawa potential, but in general the scaling constant for the equivalent point source is larger than for the shell. More specifically, the potential of a point with scaling constant $g$ outside of the shell is

$$V(r > R) = G g \frac{e^{-\alpha m r}}{r} \frac{\sinh \alpha mR}{\alpha mR}.$$

which is the same as replacing the shell with a point source with magnitude $G \frac{\sinh \alpha mR}{\alpha mR}$. The interior potential is

$$V(r < R) = G g \frac{e^{-\alpha m R}}{R} \frac{\sinh \alpha mr}{\alpha mr}.$$

If $m = 0$, then one recovers the shell theorem for the inverse square potential.

A consequence of this is that in modified gravity theories where the graviton has nonzero mass, the weak equivalence principle would be violated and the gravitational acceleration of a body in free fall would depend on its composition.

== See also ==
- Yukawa interaction
- Screened Poisson equation
- Bessel potential

== Sources ==
- Brown, G.E.; Jackson, A.D. (1976). The Nucleon-Nucleon Interaction. Amsterdam: North-Holland Publishing. ISBN 0-7204-0335-9.
