= List of computational chemists =

This is a list of persons known for work in computational chemistry.

- Reinhart Ahlrichs (1940–2016), developer of TURBOMOLE
- Norman Allinger (c. 1928–2020), developer of force fields for molecular dynamics
- Evert Jan Baerends (1945–), developer of Amsterdam Density Functional
- Kim K. Baldridge, works to develop quantum mechanical methodologies and apply quantum chemical methods to problems in life sciences, materials science, and general studies. She has contributed to programs such as GAMESS (US), QMView, and GEMSTONE.
- Elena Besley, works on the development of theoretical and computational methods for the prediction of materials properties
- Michael Buehl (1962–), known for his work on modelling of homogeneous catalysis and molecular dynamics of transition metal complexes
- Roberto Car (1947–), developer of Car–Parrinello method
- Emily A. Carter, known for orbital free DFT
- Charusita Chakravarty (1964–2016), known for her specialised application of path integral Monte Carlo method to unravel quantum mechanical effects in the properties of atomic and molecular clusters
- James R. Chelikowsky, developer of PARSEC
- G Marius Clore FRS (1955–), known for development of simulated annealing methods for solving three-dimensional structures of proteins and nucleic acids by NMR. Co-developer of XPLOR-NIH and CNS
- Clémence Corminboeuf (1977–), developing and applying state of the art computational methods for interpreting and solving chemical problems in complex systems
- David P. Craig (1919–2015), known for Ab initio quantum chemistry methods
- Nora de Leeuw, known for her work on biomaterials, sustainable energy, and carbon capture and storage
- Margaret Oakley Dayhoff (1925–1983), pioneered the application of mathematics and computational methods to the field of biochemistry
- Michael J. S. Dewar (1918–1997), developer of MOPAC
- Robert Dirks (1978–2015), known for work in nucleic acid structure prediction and design
- Inga Fischer-Hjalmars (1918–2008), known as one of the pioneers in the application of quantum mechanics to solve problems in theoretical chemistry
- Vladimir Fock (1898–1974), developer of Hartree–Fock method
- Kenichi Fukui (1918–1998), Japanese theoretical chemist, 1981 Nobel Prize in Chemistry winner for theories of chemical reactivity
- Richard A. Friesner (1952–), developer of Jaguar
- Laura Gagliardi (1968–), known for her work on the development of electronic structure methods and their use for understanding complex chemical systems
- Giulia Galli
- Jürgen Gauß, developer of CFOUR and ACES III
- William Andrew Goddard III, developer of Jaguar and ReaxFF
- Leticia González (1971–), known for her work on molecular excited states, especially ultrafast dynamics of DNA nucleobases and highly accurate simulations of transition metal complexes
- Mark S. Gordon (1942–), developer of GAMESS (US)
- Sharon Hammes-Schiffer (1966–) developer of a general theory for proton-coupled electron transfer (PCET)
- Corwin Hansch (1918–2011), known for the Hansch equation and for QSAR
- Douglas Hartree (1897–1958), developer of Hartree–Fock method
- Martin Head-Gordon (1962–), developer of Q-Chem
- Teresa Head-Gordon, develops theoretical models that are used in chemical physics and biophysics
- Trygve Helgaker (1953–), developer of Dalton
- Kersti Hermansson, researches on condensed-matter chemistry including the investigation of chemical bonding and development of quantum chemical methods
- Kendall N. Houk (1943–), well known for using the tools of computational chemistry to study organic, organometallic, and biological reactions
- Poul Jørgensen (1944–), developer of Dalton
- William L. Jorgensen (1949–), developer of BOSS and OPLS
- Lynn Kamerlin, (1981–) a theoretical organic chemist and one of the original developers of the Q software.
- Martin Karplus (1930–2024), winner of the 2013 Nobel Prize in Chemistry for "the development of multiscale models for complex chemical systems"
- Walter Kohn (1923–2016), winner of 1998 Nobel Prize in Chemistry "for his development of the density-functional theory", developer of Kohn–Sham equations
- Peter Kollman (1944–2001), developer of AMBER force field
- Anna Krylov (1967–), inventor of the spin-flip method, president of Q-Chem, Inc.
- Włodzimierz Kołos (1928–1996), pioneer of accurate calculations on the electronic structure of molecules
- Cyrus Levinthal (1922–1990), father of computer display of protein structure
- Michael Levitt (1947–), winner of the 2013 Nobel Prize in Chemistry for "the development of multiscale models for complex chemical systems"
- Hans Lischka (1943–), developer of COLUMBUS
- Benedetta Mennucci (1969–), developer of continuum solvation methods
- Keiji Morokuma (1934–2017), Japanese theoretical chemist, developer of ONIOM methods
- Debashis Mukherjee (1946–) Indian theoretical chemist known for contributions to many-body electronic structure theory
- Robert Sanderson Mulliken (1896–1986) American theoretical chemist, winner of the 1966 Nobel Prize for Chemistry for molecular orbital theory
- Frank Neese (1967–), lead author of the ORCA quantum chemistry program package
- Anthony Nicholls, developer of DelPhi and CEO of OpenEye Scientific Software
- Odile Eisenstein (1949–), a theoretical chemist who specializes in modelling the structure and reactivity of transition metals
- Rudolph Pariser (1923–2021), developer of Pariser–Parr–Pople method
- Robert Parr (1921–2017), developer of Pariser–Parr–Pople method
- Michele Parrinello (1945–), developer of Car–Parrinello method
- Sigrid D. Peyerimhoff (1937–), contributed to the development of multireference configuration interaction
- John Pople (1925–2004), winner of 1998 Nobel Prize in Chemistry "for his development of computational methods in quantum chemistry", developer of Pariser–Parr–Pople method
- Alberte Pullman (1920–2011), pioneered the application of quantum chemistry to predicting the carcinogenic properties of aromatic hydrocarbons.
- Krishnan Raghavachari (1953–), developer of CCSD(T) "Widely Regarded as the Gold Standard of Quantum Chemistry", Gaussian1-4 methods, and fragmentation based methods such as Molecules-in-Molecules (MIM) and Connectivity-Based Hierarchy (CBH).
- de:Sereina Riniker, Professor at ETH Zurich, renowned for her work in Molecular Dynamics and Chemoinformatics
- Ursula Rothlisberger, developer of QM/MM methods
- Kenneth Ruud (1969–), developer of Dalton
- Yousef Saad, developer of PARSEC
- Chris Sander, developer of WHAT IF
- Joachim Sauer (1949–), codeveloper of QMPOT
- Henry F. Schaefer, III (1944–), director of the Center for Computational Chemistry and developer of PSI (computational chemistry)
- Annabella Selloni
- Lu Jeu Sham (1938–), developer of Kohn–Sham equations
- Carlos Simmerling, developer of AMBER force field
- Hertha Sponer (1895–1968), contributed to modern quantum mechanics
- Donald Truhlar (1944–), developer of Minnesota functionals
- Giovanni Vignale (1957–), known for density functional theory
- Saraswathi Vishveshwara, uses computational-mathematical techniques to understand the functioning of macromolecules such as proteins
- Arieh Warshel (1940–), winner of the 2013 Nobel Prize in Chemistry for "the development of multiscale models for complex chemical systems"
- David Weininger (1952–2016), known for the SMILES chemical line notation
- Angela K. Wilson, an American physical, theoretical, and computational chemist.
- Weitao Yang (1961–), known for density functional theory
