= Piotr Piecuch =

Polish-born American physical chemist

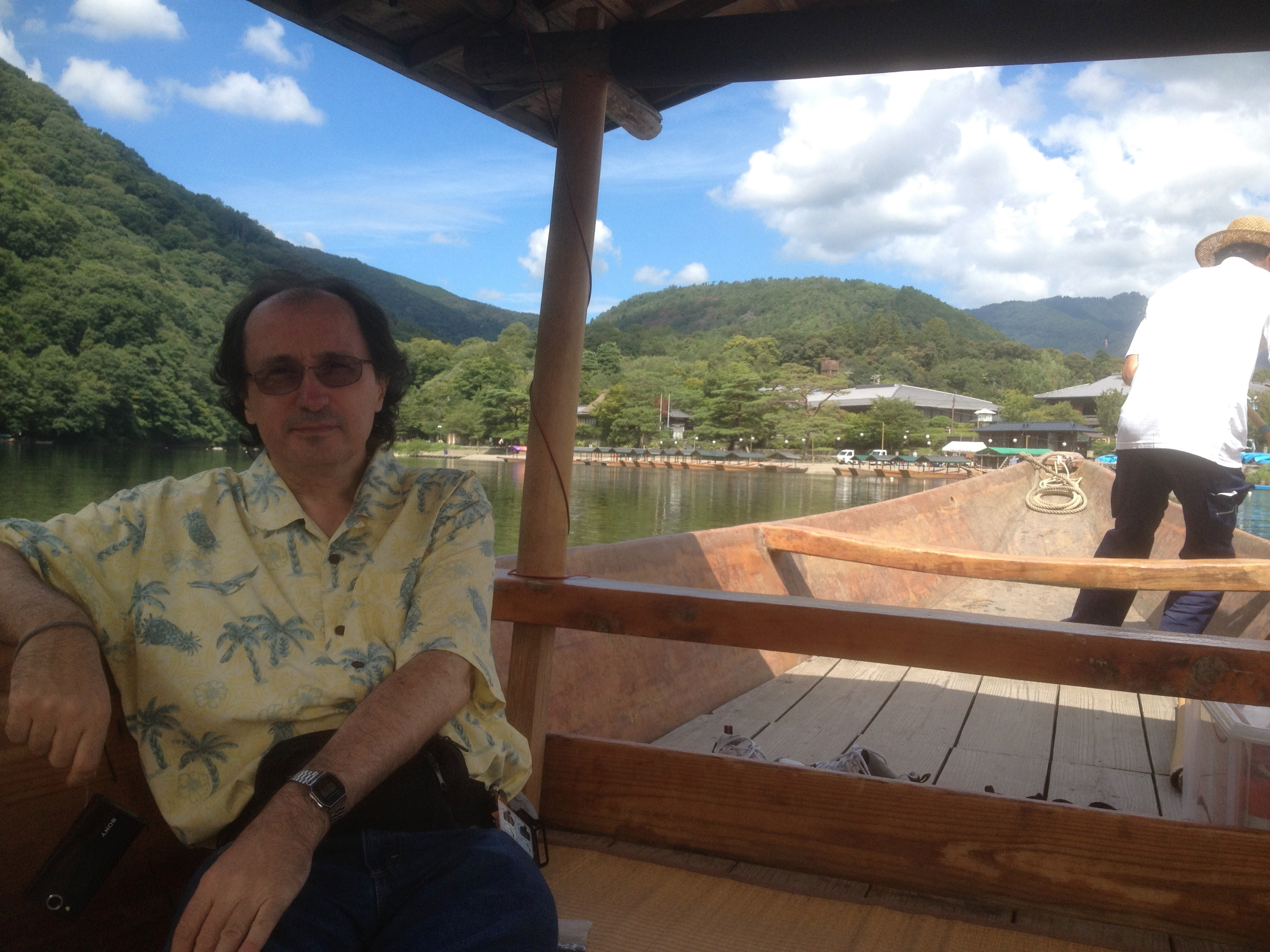
- Piotr Piecuch visiting Japan in 2012
- Born: 21 January 1960 (age 66); Wrocław, Poland
- Education: University of Wrocław
- Known for: Computational methods in quantum chemistry and physics
- Scientific career
- Fields: Theoretical chemistry Quantum chemistry Computational chemistry Theoretical physics Computational Physics; Quantum physics
- Workplaces: Michigan State University
- Doctoral advisor: Henryk Ratajczak
- Other academic advisors: Josef Paldus; Ludwik Adamowicz; John C. Polanyi; Rodney J. Bartlett

Piotr Piecuch (born January 21, 1960) is a Polish-born American physical chemist. He holds the titles of University Distinguished Professor and MSU Research Foundation Professor in the Department of Chemistry at Michigan State University. He supervises a group, whose research focuses on theoretical and computational chemistry as well as theoretical and computational physics, particularly on the development and applications of many-body methods for accurate quantum calculations for molecular systems and atomic nuclei, including methods based on coupled cluster theory, mathematical methods of chemistry and physics, and theory of intermolecular forces. His group is responsible for the development of the coupled-cluster computer codes incorporated in the widely used GAMESS (US) package and maintains several open-source codes on GitHub.

== Education and academic posts ==
Piecuch studied chemistry at the undergraduate and graduate levels at the University of Wrocław, Poland. He received his M.S. degree in 1983 and Ph.D. degree in 1988. After postdoctoral and research faculty appointments at the University of Waterloo, Canada (1988–91, 1994–95), where he worked with Professors Josef Paldus and Jiří Čížek, University of Arizona (1992–93), where he worked with Professor Ludwik Adamowicz, University of Toronto, Canada (1995–97), where he worked with the recipient of the 1986 Nobel Prize in Chemistry, Professor John Polanyi, and University of Florida (1997–98), where he worked with Professor Rodney J. Bartlett, he joined the faculty at Michigan State University as an assistant professor in 1998. He was promoted to an associate professor in 2002 and professor in 2004. He was named a University Distinguished Professor in 2007, and in 2020, he was awarded the title of MSU Research Foundation Professor. While his primary appointment at Michigan State University is with the Department of Chemistry, he has also held adjunct professorship appointments in the Department of Physics and Astronomy (2003–10, 2014-). During his tenure at Michigan State University, he was named a visiting professor at the University of Coimbra, Portugal (2006), Kyoto University, Japan (2005), Institute for Molecular Science, National Institutes of Natural Sciences, in Okazaki, Japan (2012–13), and a Clark Way Harrison Distinguished Visiting Professor at the Washington University in St. Louis, United States (2016). The latter visit resulted in the creation of the online lecture series on algebraic and diagrammatic methods for many-fermion systems, consisting of more than 40 high-definition videos, available on YouTube.

== Research interests and accomplishments ==
Piecuch has established himself as one of the leaders of electronic structure theory. Of particular note are his contributions to coupled-cluster and many-body theories. His work on the renormalized and active-space coupled-cluster methods is especially important, since the resulting approximations, such as CR-CC(2,3), CCSDt, or CC(t;3), and their extensions utilizing the equation-of-motion coupled-cluster concepts, for example, CR-EOMCC, EOMCCSDt, etc., can accurately describe potential energy surfaces, biradicals, and electronic excitations in molecules without resorting to complex multi-reference wave functions. His ideas of semi-stochastic, selected-configuration-interaction-driven, and adaptive coupled-cluster approaches based on the CC(P;Q) formalism and his contributions to single and double electron attachment and ionization potential equation-of-motion coupled-cluster theories have attracted attention as well.

In general, Piecuch has been among the early and leading developers of state-selective and orthogonally spin-adapted state-universal multi-reference coupled-cluster approaches, as well as linear-response, extended, generalized, and externally corrected coupled-cluster methods. The latter methods include a wide range of approximate coupled-pair approaches for strongly correlated systems. His group and collaborators have also implemented linear scaling, local correlation coupled-cluster methods for large systems. The resulting multi-level local schemes that combine higher-level methods, such as CR-CC(2,3), to treat reactive parts of large molecular systems, with lower-order local or canonical methods, such as MP2 or CCSD, to describe chemically inactive regions are particularly valuable.

Although the exponential wave function ansatz of coupled-cluster theory was originally proposed by nuclear physicists, it initially found limited applications in nuclear structure theory. Piecuch and his associates, and their co-workers working in the area of nuclear theory have demonstrated the great utility of quantum-chemistry-inspired coupled-cluster approximations in the field of nuclear physics.

In addition to his coupled-cluster work, Piecuch has made major contributions to fundamental understanding and formal description of intermolecular forces, particularly pairwise non-additive effects, and developed potential energy surface extrapolation schemes based on scaling correlation energies. He has applied theoretical methods to solve many important problems in chemistry and physics. This is exemplified in papers by his group and collaborators on molecular spectroscopy, reaction dynamics, including photo- and strong-field-induced processes, bound and quasi-bound rovibrational states in van der Waals complexes, structural and electronic properties of metallic clusters, reaction mechanisms in organic and bioinorganic chemistry, catalysis, photochemistry, and photophysics.

As of May 29, 2026, his research has resulted in more than 200 publications that according to the Web of Science Core Collection have received about 16,000 citations and the h-index of 67. On May 29, 2026, Google Scholar reported about 20,000 citations and the h-index of 76. In particular, Piecuch's original contributions to coupled-cluster theory, as applied to molecular problems, have been extensively discussed in the scientific literature. His intermolecular forces theory effort has been reviewed by several authors as well. His nuclear coupled-cluster theory research, in addition to being cited in the scientific literature, has received attention in more popular publications. As of May 29, 2026, he has given 319 invited lectures at national and international symposia, and academic and research institutions in the United States, Australia, Brazil, Canada, Chile, China, Czech Republic, France, Germany, Greece, Hungary, India, Italy, Japan, New Zealand, Norway, Poland, Portugal, Russia, Slovakia, South Africa, South Korea, Spain, Sweden, Switzerland, Tunisia, and United Kingdom. He has co-edited 6 books and 3 special journal issues, and served on many scientific committees, review panels, and advisory boards, including the editorial boards of several scientific journals and book series. He currently serves as an Associate Editor of Theoretical Chemistry Accounts.

== Selected publications ==
- Piecuch, P. (1986). "Spherical Tensor Theory of Long-Range Interactions in a System of N Arbitrary Molecules Including Quantum-Mechanical Many-Body Effects. I. Anisotropic Induction Interactions in the First Three Orders of Perturbation Theory". Mol. Phys. 59: 1067–1083. doi:10.1080/00268978600102591.
- Piecuch, P.; Paldus, J. (1992). "Orthogonally Spin-Adapted Multi-Reference Hilbert Space Coupled-Cluster Formalism: Diagrammatic Formulation". Theor. Chim. Acta. 83: 69–103. doi:10.1007/BF01113244.
- Piecuch, P.; Oliphant, N.; Adamowicz, L. (1993). "A State-Selective Multi-Reference Coupled-Cluster Theory Employing the Single-Reference Formalism". J. Chem. Phys. 99: 1875–1900. doi:10.1063/1.466179.
- Kowalski, K.; Piecuch, P. (2000). "The Method of Moments of Coupled-Cluster Equations and the Renormalized CCSD[T], CCSD(T), CCSD(TQ), and CCSDT(Q) Approaches". J. Chem. Phys. 113: 18–35. doi:10.1063/1.481769.
- Kowalski, K.; Piecuch, P. (2001). "The Active-Space Equation-of-Motion Coupled-Cluster Methods for Excited Electronic States: Full EOMCCSDt". J. Chem. Phys. 115: 643–651. doi:10.1063/1.1378323.
- Piecuch, P.; Kowalski, K.; Fan, P.-D.; Jedziniak, K. (2003). "Exactness of Two-Body Cluster Expansions in Many-Body Quantum Theory". Phys. Rev. Lett. 90: 113001-1 – 113001-4. doi:10.1103/PhysRevLett.90.113001.
- Włoch, M.; Dean, D.J.; Gour, J.R.; Hjorth-Jensen, M.; Kowalski, K.; Papenbrock, T.; Piecuch, P. (2005). "Ab-Initio Coupled-Cluster Study of ^{16}O". Phys. Rev. Lett. 94: 212501-1 – 212501-4. arXiv:nucl-th/0501067. doi:10.1103/PhysRevLett.94.212501.
- Piecuch, P.; Włoch, M. (2005). "Renormalized Coupled-Cluster Methods Exploiting Left Eigenstates of the Similarity-Transformed Hamiltonian". J. Chem. Phys. 123: 224105-1 – 224105-10. doi:10.1063/1.2137318.
- Li, W.; Piecuch, P. (2010). "Multi-level Extension of the Cluster-In-Molecule Local Correlation Methodology: Merging Coupled-Cluster and Møller–Plesset Perturbation Theories". J. Phys. Chem. A. 114: 6721–6727. doi:10.1021/jp1038738.
- Piecuch, P.; Hansen, J.A.; Staedter, D.; Faure, S.; Blanchet, V. (2013). "Communication: Existence of the Doubly Excited State that Mediates the Photoionization of Azulene". J. Chem. Phys. 138: 201102-1 – 201102-4. doi:10.1063/1.4808014.
- Deustua, J.E.; Shen, J.; Piecuch, P. (2017). "Converging High-Level Coupled-Cluster Energetics by Monte Carlo Sampling and Moment Expansions". Phys. Rev. Lett. 119: 223003-1 – 223003-5. doi:10.1103/PhysRevLett.119.223003.
- Yuwono, S.H.; Magoulas, I.; Piecuch, P. (2020). "Quantum Computation Solves a Half-Century-Old Enigma: Elusive Vibrational States of Magnesium Dimer Found". Sci. Adv. 6 eaay4058: 12 pages. doi:10.1126/sciadv.aay4058. PMC 7124942.
- Reimers, J.R.; Shen, J.; Kianinia, M.; Bradac, C.; Aharonovich, I.; Ford, M.J.; Piecuch, P. (2020). "Photoluminescence, Photophysics, and Photochemistry of the $\mathrm{V_B^-}$ Defect in Hexagonal Boron Nitride". Phys. Rev. B. 102: 144105-1 – 144105-17. arXiv:2006.16474. doi:10.1103/PhysRevB.102.144105.
- Stamm, J.; Priyadarsini, S.S.; Sandhu, S.; Chakraborty, A.; Shen, J.; Kwon, S.; Sandhu, J.; Wicka, C.; Mehmood, A.; Levine, B.G.; Piecuch, P.; Dantus, M. (2025). "Factors Governing H_{3}^{+} Formation from Methyl Halogens and Pseudohalogens". Nat. Commun. 16 410: 14 pages. doi:10.1038/s41467-024-55065-5.
- Shen, J.; Gururangan, K.; Piecuch, P. (2026). "Double Electron Attachment and Double Ionization Potential Equation-of-Motion Coupled-Cluster Approaches with Full and Active-Space Treatments of 4-Particle–2-Hole and 4-Hole–2-Particle Excitations and Three-Body Clusters". Chem. Phys. Lett. 896 142880: 9 pages. arXiv:2605.20556. doi:10.1016/j.cplett.2026.142880.

== Awards and honors ==
Piecuch is an elected foreign member of the Polish Academy of Sciences (2026), an elected member of the International Academy of Quantum Molecular Science (2018), an elected Fellow of the Royal Society of Chemistry (2016), an elected Distinguished Fellow of the Kosciuszko Foundation Collegium of Eminent Scientists (2015), an elected Fellow of the American Association for the Advancement of Science (2011), an elected Fellow of the American Physical Society (2008), an Elected Member of the European Academy of Sciences, Arts and Humanities in Paris, France (2003), and a recipient of a number of other awards and honors, including, in addition to the titles of the University Distinguished Professor (2007) and MSU Research Foundation Professor (2020), the Xingda Lectureship at Peking University (2019), the Lawrence J. Schaad Lectureship in Theoretical Chemistry at Vanderbilt University (2017), the S.R. Palit Memorial Lecture at the Indian Association for the Cultivation of Science (2007), the Invitation Fellowship of the Japan Society for the Promotion of Science (2005), the QSCP Senior Scientist Medal of Centre de Mécanique Ondulatoire Appliquée, France, for "Outstanding Scientific and Human Achievement" (2025), the QSCP Promising Scientist Prize of Centre de Mécanique Ondulatoire Appliquée, France, for "Scientific and Human Endeavour and Achievement" (2004), the Alfred P. Sloan Research Fellowship (2002–2004), the Wiley–International Journal of Quantum Chemistry Young Investigator Award (2000), three awards from the Polish Chemical Society for Research (1983, 1986, 1992), the award from the Minister of National Education of Poland (1989), and two awards from the Polish Academy of Sciences (1982). A special issue of Molecular Physics in honor of Piecuch was published in 2025.

== Personal life ==
Piecuch was born in Wrocław, Poland, to Telesfor and Hanna Piecuch, and has one sister, Katarzyna. He is married to Jolanta Piecuch (maiden name Sanetra). They have one daughter, Anna Piecuch.

== External resources ==
- Piotr Piecuch's MSU profile
