= List of Guggenheim Fellowships awarded in 1995 =

List of Guggenheim Fellowships awarded in 1995

Fellow	Category	Field of Study
Henry Abelove	Humanities	Philosophy
Jonathan James Graham Alexander	Humanities	Fine Arts Research
Mark Antliff	Humanities	Fine Arts Research
Skip Arnold	Creative Arts	Fine Arts
Ruth Behar		Iberian & Latin American History
Jonathan Bennett	Humanities	Philosophy
Ravindra N. Bhatt		Physics
Linda Bierds		Poetry
Sandow Birk		Fine Arts
Joseph A. Boone		Literary Criticism
Alfonse Borysewicz		Fine Arts
Barbara Bosworth	Creative Arts	Photography
Donald E. Camp	Creative Arts	Photography
Federico Campbell		Fiction
Carlos Capelán		Fine Arts
Carole Caroompas		Fine Arts
Arturo Carrera		Poetry
Olivia Lucia Carrescia	Creative Arts	Film
James Casebere	Creative Arts	Photography
Sarah Charlesworth		Fine Arts
James R. Chelikowsky		Engineering
Dorothy L. Cheney		Organismic Biology & Ecology
Luis Maria Chiappe		Organismic Biology & Ecology
Abigail Child	Creative Arts	Film
Nancy J. Chodorow		Sociology
Osvaldo Civitarese		Physics
Maxine Clair		Fiction
Marcelo Cohen		Fiction
Michael Collier	Creative Arts	Poetry
Maureen Connor		Fine Arts
Todd J. Cooke		Plant Sciences
Frank Costigliola		U.S. History
Gary W. Cox	Social Sciences	Political Science
Catherine Craig		Organismic Biology & Ecology
Juan Carlos Cremata Malberti	Creative Arts	Film
Ann Hunt Currier	Creative Arts	Photography
George F. Custen	Humanities	Film, Video, & Radio Studies
Pellegrino A. D'Acierno		Film, Video, & Radio Studies
E. Valentine Daniel		Anthropology & Cultural Studies
Paul McE. Davis		Earth Science
Carlos I. Degregori		Political Science
René Depestre		General Nonfiction
Dean Drummond		Music Composition
Alberto Durant	Creative Arts	Film
R. David Edmunds		U.S. History
Yakov Eliashberg	Natural Sciences	Mathematics
Susanna Elm	Humanities	Religion
James Emery	Creative Arts	Music Composition
Martha Julia Farah	Social Sciences	Psychology
Christopher A. Faraone	Humanities	Classics
Ariel Fernandez	Natural Sciences	Physics
Antonio Eligio Fernández Rodriguez	Creative Arts	Fine Arts
León Ferrari	Creative Arts	Fine Arts
Richard A. Firtel	Natural Sciences	Molecular & Cellular Biology
Vernon Fisher	Creative Arts	Fine Arts
Steven A. Frank	Natural Sciences	Organismic Biology & Ecology
Felice Frankel	Natural Sciences	Science Writing
Alice T. Friedman	Humanities	Architecture, Planning, & Design
Gladys-Marie Fry	Humanities	Folklore & Popular Culture
Neal Gabler	Creative Arts	Biography
Huajian Gao		Engineering
Alicia E. Garcia Santana		Architecture, Planning, & Design
Boris Gasparov		Slavic Literature
Gary Gerstle		U.S. History
Steve Gianakos		Fine Arts
Dagoberto Gilb		Fiction
Wendy Z. Goldman		Russian History
Osvaldo Noé Golijov		Music Composition
James Gordley		Law
Gennady Gorelik		History of Science & Technology
Patricia M. Graney	Creative Arts	Choreography
Yuri Gurevich		Computer Science
Peter Haidu	Humanities	Medieval Literature
Gwendolyn Midlo Hall		U.S. History
Timothy Hampton		French Literature
Gail G. Hanson		Physics
Saul Haymond		Fine Arts
Douglas Hobbie		Fiction
Carl A. Huffman		Classics
Ann Hulbert		General Nonfiction
David Ives	Creative Arts	Drama & Performance Art
Ken Jacobs	Creative Arts	Film
Daniel Javitch		Italian Literature
Tamara Jenkins	Creative Arts	Film
Paul E. Johnson		U.S. History
Albert R. Jonsen		Intellectual & Cultural History
Ben Katchor		Fiction
Lodge Kerrigan	Creative Arts	Film
Peter Kilby		African Studies
Steven A. Kivelson		Physics
Raoul Kopelman		Chemistry
Pedro Labarca		Molecular & Cellular Biology
David D. Laitin		Political Science
Donna Landry		English Literature
Takie S. Lebra		Anthropology & Cultural Studies
Patrick A. Lee		Physics
Adriana Lestido	Creative Arts	Photography
David Lawrence Levinthal	Creative Arts	Photography
Ronald M. Levy		Molecular & Cellular Biology
Moshe Lewin		Russian History
Mary S. Lewis		Bibliography
Tien-Yien Li		Applied Mathematics
Alan Liu		Literary Criticism
David Loewenstein		English Literature
James Longenbach		American Literature
Derek Mahon		Poetry
Ursula Mamlok		Music Composition
Bruce Mannheim		Anthropology & Cultural Studies
George M. Marsden	Creative Arts	Biography
John Martin		Renaissance History
Frederick Marx	Creative Arts	Film
E. Ann Matter		Religion
Enrique J. Mayer		Anthropology & Cultural Studies
John H. McDowell		Folklore & Popular Culture
Marjorie K. McIntosh		Medieval History
Lynne McMahon		Poetry
Cildo Meireles		Fine Arts
María Rosa Menocal		Medieval Literature
Carolyn Merchant		Intellectual & Cultural History
Brinkley Messick		Anthropology & Cultural Studies
James R. Millar		Economic History
Mary Miller		Anthropology & Cultural Studies
Alejandra Moreno Toscano		Iberian & Latin American History
Henri Moscovici		Mathematics
Thylias Moss		Poetry
Jeffrey Mumford		Music Composition
William Thomas Newsome		Neuroscience
Karen Offen	Humanities	French History
Iwao Ojima	Natural Sciences	Chemistry
Ingram Olkin	Natural Sciences	Statistics
Harry V. Orlyk	Creative Arts	Fine Arts
Darcy Marie Padilla	Creative Arts	Photography
Dennis G. Pardee		Near Eastern Studies
Ann Patchett		Fiction
Steve Paxton	Creative Arts	Choreography
Gabriel Peluffo Linari		Fine Arts Research
Marilene Phipps		Fine Arts
Tristan Platt		Iberian & Latin American History
Sorin Teodor Popa		Mathematics
Helen Prejean		General Nonfiction
Andrew Rindfleisch		Music Composition
Fernando Rodriguez Villegas		Mathematics
Michael Rosenthal	Creative Arts	Biography
Doris Salcedo		Fine Arts
Laura Salmon	Creative Arts	Photography
Edward T. Samulski		Chemistry
Peter Schjeldahl		General Nonfiction
Robert A. Schneider		French History
R. Keith Schoppa		East Asian Studies
Juliet B. Schor		Economics
Anthony Seeger		Anthropology & Cultural Studies
Robert M. Seyfarth		Organismic Biology & Ecology
Susan Slyomovics		Near Eastern Studies
Neil Smith		Geography & Environmental Studies
Paul Smolensky		Psychology
Reba N. Soffer		British History
Thomas Spear		African Studies
Gayatri Chakravorty Spivak		Literary Criticism
George Steinmetz		Sociology
David B. Stern		Molecular & Cellular Biology
Eve Sussman	Creative Arts	Fine Arts
Bart M. Taub	Social Sciences	Economics
John Jay TePaske	Humanities	Iberian & Latin American History
Janis Tomlinson	Humanities	Fine Arts Research
Susan Treggiari	Humanities	Classics
Osvaldo D. Uchitel	Natural Sciences	Neuroscience
Lawrence J. Vale	Humanities	Architecture, Planning, & Design
J. Samuel Valenzuela	Social Sciences	Anthropology & Cultural Studies
Fernando Vidal	Humanities	Philosophy
Paula Vogel	Creative Arts	Drama & Performance Art
Peter Waite	Creative Arts	Fine Arts
John F. C. Wardle	Natural Sciences	Astronomy—Astrophysics
Michael S. Waterman	Natural Sciences	Molecular & Cellular Biology
Edith Wyschogrod	Humanities	Religion
Robert Rahway Zakanitch	Creative Arts	Fine Arts
Alexander B. Zamolodchikov	Natural Sciences	Physics
Catherine W. Zerner	Humanities	Architecture, Planning, & Design
Franklin E. Zimring	Social Sciences	Law
Ricardo Zohn-Muldoon	Creative Arts	Music Composition

== See also ==
- Guggenheim Fellowship
