= Agence Vu =

French photo agency

Agence VU
- Industry: Photography
- Founded: 1986
- Founder: Christian Caujolle and Zina Rouabah
- Headquarters: Hôtel Paul Delaroche, 58 Rue Saint Lazare, 75009 Paris
- Area served: Europe
- Products: Photojournalism, stock photography
- Website: agencevu.com

Agence Vu' (stylised as Agence VU and Agence VU') is a photography agency established in 1986 that has headquarters on Rue Saint-Lazare in Paris. It works with both photojournalists and art photographers, not specialising in one field of photography. It sells photographs, produces books, exhibitions and has a gallery called Gallery Vu (stylised as Gallery VU'). Xavier Soule is its president and director.

== History ==
Agence VU was established by fr:Christian Caujolle and fr:Zina Rouabah in 1986. It is named after France's first illustrated magazine, Vu (stylised as VU), of the 1920s. It was sold in 1997 to Abvent group.

== Members ==
- fr:Michael Ackerman
- Martina Bacigalupo
- Massimo Berruti
- Alain Bizos
- Bruno Boudjelal
- Philippe Brault
- Juan Manuel Castro Prieto
- Kathryn Cook
- Denis Dailleux
- Jean-Robert Dantou
- fr:Denis Darzacq
- fr:Pierre-Olivier Deschamps
- Bertrand Desprez
- Miquel Dewever-Plana
- Stephen Dock
- Claudine Doury
- Stéphane Duroy
- Gilles Favier
- Maia Flore
- Cédric Gerbehaye
- Stanislas Guigui
- Liz Hingley
- Marin Hocq
- fr:Rip Hopkins
- fr:Françoise Huguier
- Steeve Iuncker
- fr:Ouka Leele
- José Manuel Navia
- Darcy Padilla
- Ian Teh
- Pieter Ten Hoopen
- fr:Lars Tunbjörk
- Gaël Turine
- Ad Van Denderen
- fr:Michel Vanden Eeckhoudt
- Paolo Verzone
- Munem Wasif
- Vanessa Winship
- Hugues de Wurstemberger
- Michael Zumstein

== Gallery VU' ==
Agence Vu has a gallery, Gallery Vu' (stylised as Gallery VU'), at the same location as the agency. It opened in 1998 and has six exhibitions each year.

== Publications ==
=== Books ===
- Agence VU, 15 ans. Martinière, 2001.
- VU' à Paris. Panini, 2006. ISBN 978-2-84538-712-6. French text. Preface by fr:Christian Caujolle, text by Magali Jauffret, photographs by 18 Agence Vu photographers.
- VU' à Orsay. Panini; Musée d'Orsay, 2006. ISBN 978-2-905724-69-4. English and French text. Introduction by Serge Lemoine, text by Christian Caujolle, photographs by Gabriele Basilico, Rip Hopkins, Richard Dumas, Juan Manuel Castro-Pietro and Stanley Greene.
- 80+80 Photo_Graphisme. Paris: Filigranes; Aman Iman, 2006. ISBN 978-2-350460-69-7. With Anatome graphic design agency.
- Agence VU' Galerie. Arles, France: fr:Actes Sud, 2006. ISBN 978-2-7427-6068-8. Photo Poche No. 107.
- Circonstances particulières. Arles, France: Actes Sud, 2007. ISBN 978-2-7427-6873-8. By Christian Caujolle.
- VU MAG. Aman Iman, 2009. ISBN 978-2-7324-2925-0.

=== VU' Mag ===
- VU Mag. Paris: Filigranes, 2008. ISBN 978-2-35046-132-8. Text by Eric Audinet, Christian Caujolle, Naxto Checa, Catherine Coleman, Gösta Flemming, Hélène Pinet and Cédric de Veigy.
- VU Mag 2: Japon. Paris: Filigranes; Aman Iman, 2008. ISBN 978-2-35046-148-9. Text by Anne Biroleau, Irène Attinger, Marc Feustel, Claude Leblanc, Manfred Heiting and Antonin Potoski.
- VU Mag 3: au Cinéma. Paris: Filigranes; Aman Iman, 2009. ISBN 978-2-9533910-0-8. Text by Serge Daney, Serge Toubiana, Dytivon, David Marcilhacy, Christian Caujolle, Benoît Rivero, Richard Dumas and Stéphane Raymond.
- VU Mag 4: émergence. Agence et Galerie VU'; Aman Iman, 2009. ISBN 978-2-9533910-1-5. Text by Amin Maalouf, Mustapha Chérif, Yasmine Eid-Sabbagh, Atiq Rahimi, Michael Onfray, Jean-Claude Carrière and Isabelle Eshraghi.
- VU Mag 5 Collections. VU' Editions; Aman Iman, 2010. ISBN 978-2-9533910-4-6. Text by Pierre-Alexis Dumas, Philippe Vayssettes, Aline Pujo, Pascal Ordonneau, François Lapeyre and others.
