= MQL =

MQL may refer to:

- Mbelime, an Oti–Volta language
- Merseyside Quiz Leagues
- MetaQuotes Language, the programming language of MetaTrader 4 software
- Metaweb Query Language, the programming language of Freebase software
- Mildura Airport, IATA code MQL
- Molecular Query Language, a query language used in chemoinformatics
- Marketing Qualified Lead
- Minimum quantity lubrication, a type of lubrication using minimal lubricant, with applications in bearings and cutting fluids
- Manchester Quays Ltd, a partnership between Manchester City Council and Allied London
