= PARSEC =

PARSEC is a package designed to perform electronic structure calculations of solids and molecules using density functional theory (DFT). The acronym stands for Pseudopotential Algorithm for Real-Space Electronic Calculations. It solves the Kohn–Sham equations in real space, without the use of explicit basis sets.

One of the strengths of this code is that it handles non-periodic boundary conditions in a natural way, without the use of super-cells, but can equally well handle periodic and partially periodic boundary conditions. Another key strength is that it is readily amenable to efficient massive parallelization, making it highly effective for very large systems.

Its development started in early 1990s with James Chelikowsky (now at the University of Texas), Yousef Saad and collaborators at the University of Minnesota. The code is freely available under the GNU GPLv2. Currently, its public version is 1.4.4. Some of the physical/chemical properties calculated by this code are: Kohn–Sham band structure, atomic forces (including molecular dynamics capabilities), static susceptibility, magnetic dipole moment, and many additional molecular and solid state properties.

== See also ==
- Density functional theory
- Quantum chemistry computer programs
