= CTCC =

CTCC may refer to:

== Sports ==
- China Touring Car Championship, a touring car racing series based in China
- CTCC - Canadian Touring Car Championship, a touring car racing series based in Canada

== Institutes ==
- Centre for Theoretical and Computational Chemistry, founded by the Norwegian Research Council in 2007

== Others ==
- Calgary Telus Convention Centre, a convention centre in Calgary, Alberta, Canada
- Chandigarh Territorial Congress Committee or Chandigarh Pradesh Congress Committee (CPCC), branch of the Indian National Congress in Chandigarh
