= Katerina Cizek =

Canadian filmmaker and web documentarian

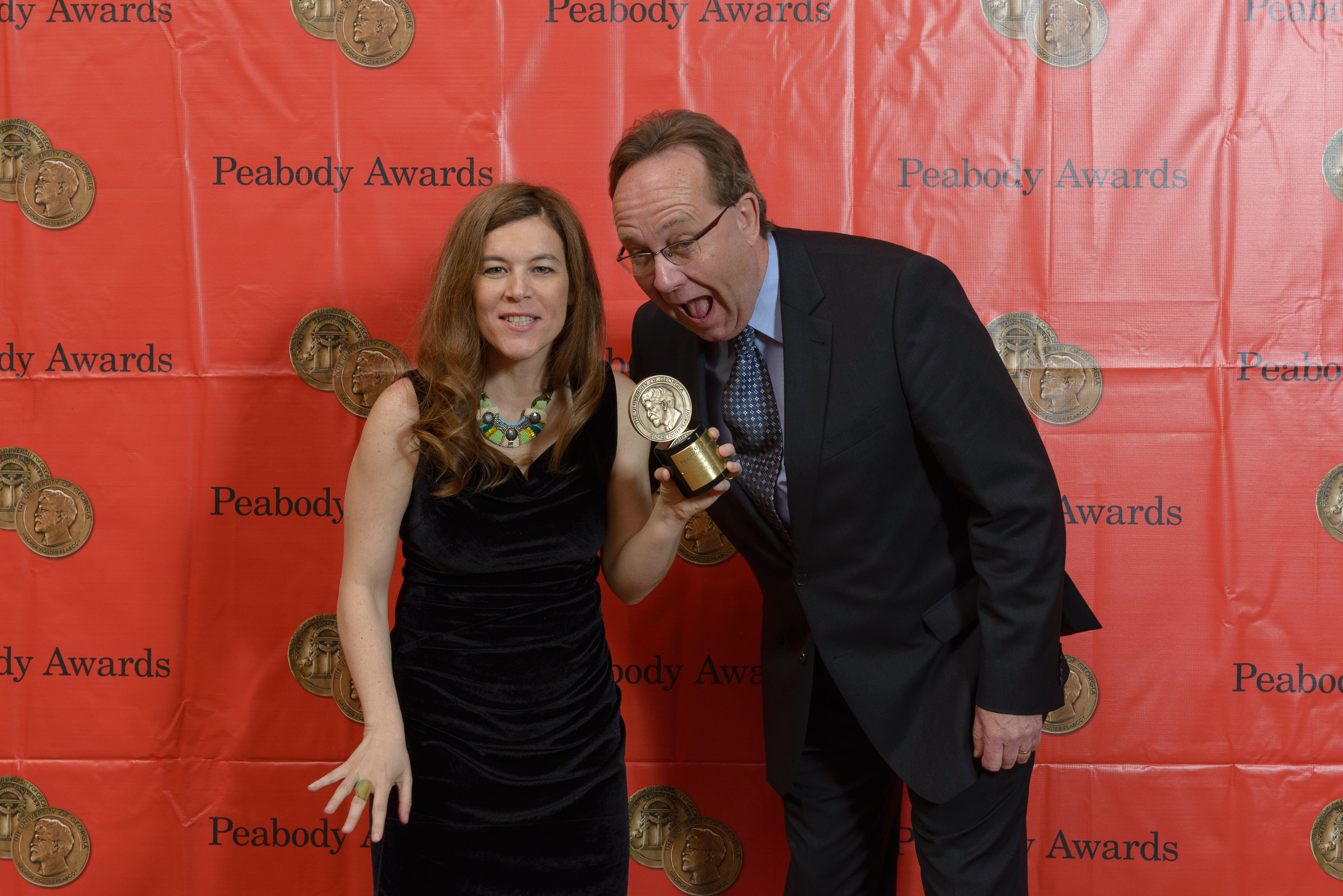
Cizek and producer Gerry Flahive with their Peabody award

Katerina Cizek (born 1969) is a Canadian documentary director and a pioneer in digital documentaries. She is the Artistic Director, Co-Founder and Executive Producer of the Co-Creation Studio at MIT Open Documentary Lab (Massachusetts Institute of Technology).

== Highrise ==
From 2008-2015, Cizek directed the National Film Board of Canada's Highrise series on life in residential skyscrapers, including the 2010 world's first 360 degree web documentary Out My Window, winner of the inaugural IDFA DocLab Award for Digital Storytelling at the International Documentary Film Festival Amsterdam and an International Digital Emmy for best digital program: non-fiction, and the 2011 webdoc One Millionth Tower, which lets users explore a highrise complex in 3D virtual space, as Toronto residents re-imagine their neighborhood.

A Short History of the Highrise is an interactive documentary that "explores the 2,500-year global history of vertical living and issues of social equality in an increasingly urbanized world." The centerpiece of the project is four short films by Cizek—Mud, Concrete and Glass—with images culled from The New York Times's visual archives, that are "intended to evoke a chapter in a storybook, with rhyming narration and photographs brought to life with intricate animation." The fourth short film, Home, is being made with user-submitted images. The interactive site will incorporate the films and also offer additional archival materials, text and microgames. It premiered as part of the Film Society of Lincoln Center’s New York Film Festival Convergence program on September 30, 2013 and online at NYTimes.com in October. In April 2014, Cizek received a Peabody Award for A Short History of the Highrise, followed by a News & Documentary Emmy Award in the fall of 2014.

Cizek collaborated with the Massachusetts Institute of Technology's OpenDocLab unit to develop the final production in the Highrise project called Universe Within. As part of MIT’s Visiting Artists Program, she worked with scholars and apartment residents to ask how new technological forms are reshaping personal lives in suburban high-rise communities.

Universe Within is the final iteration of NFB Highrise, directed by Cizek and co-created with Digital Agency Secret Location and Dr. Deborah Cowen and Dr. Emily Paradis. On March 8, 2016, Universe Within received the award for Best Original Interactive Production Produced for Digital Media at the 4th Canadian Screen Awards. At the 2016 Webby Awards, Universe Within received the Webby for Online Film & Video/Best Use of Interactive Video.

== Filmmaker-in-Residence ==
Prior to working on Highrise, Cizek directed an NFB crossmedia documentary project about life inside Toronto’s St. Michael’s Hospital. Called Filmmaker-in-Residence, it garnered a Webby Award for Best Documentary Series.

== Other credits ==
Prior to joining the NFB, her films included Seeing is Believing: Handicams, Human Rights and the News, co-directed with Peter Wintonick.

== Research and teaching ==
She is currently heading up a new research and production initiative at MIT Open Documentary Lab. Cizek and NFB producer Gerry Flahive collaborated on academic research with urbanist Roger Kiel on how cities are changing, with the Global Suburbanisms program at York University. Cizek collaborated closely with an academic team at University of Toronto on the final iteration of HIGHRISE, on a joint book and documentary project about Digital Citizenship in the Global Suburbs. Cizek is a long-time teacher at the annual ESoDoc workshops. She teaches new media approaches to documentary creation.

== Personal life ==
Cizek was born in 1969 in Waterloo, Ontario. The daughter of Czech immigrants, she now lives in the Roncesvalles neighbourhood in Toronto. Cizek has a degree in anthropology from McGill University in Montreal and worked as an independent filmmaker before joining the National Film Board of Canada, where she worked as a filmmaker-in-residence. Her father Jiří Čížek taught quantum physics at the University of Waterloo. He is known for introducing Coupled cluster theory.
