= Ricardo Zohn-Muldoon =

Mexican-American composer (born 1962)

Ricardo Zohn-Muldoon (born 1962, in Guadalajara, México) is a Mexican-American composer and chair of the composition department at Eastman School of Music. He received the Helen L. Weiss Music Prize in 1991. His Comala (2010, Bridge Records 9325) was a finalist for the 2011 Pulitzer Prize for Music and he was awarded a Guggenheim Fellowship in 1995, a Mozart Medal in 1994, and a Lillian Fairchild Award in 2011. He was a student of George Crumb.

Comala, a cantata based on Juan Rulfo's Pedro Páramo, was premiered by The Furious Band at the Festival Música y Escena in México City.
