= Kenneth Ruud =

Norwegian chemist (born 1969)

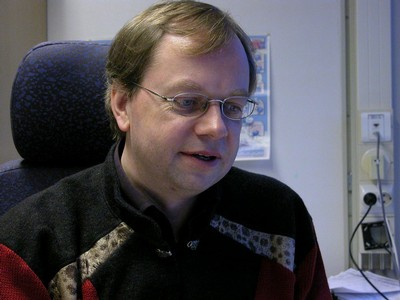
- Kenneth Ruud
- Born: 16 September 1969 (age 56); Fredrikstad, Norway
- Education: University of Oslo
- Awards: WATOC Dirac medal (2008)
- Scientific career
- Fields: Theoretical chemistry
- Workplaces: University of Tromsø
- Doctoral advisor: Trygve Helgaker

Kenneth Ruud (born 16 September 1969) is a Norwegian chemist.

He is a professor of chemistry at the University of Tromsø. He is author or coauthor of more than 150 scientific articles and director of the Centre for Theoretical and Computational Chemistry in Tromsø. In 2008, he was the recipient of the Dirac medal from the World Association of Theoretical and Computational Chemists. He is one of the main contributors to the DALTON program package.

In 2012 he was elected fellow of the Norwegian Academy of Science and Letters.

Since April 2010, Kenneth is president of the Norwegian Chemical Society.

In February 2013, Kenneth was elected Prorektor (= Vicepresident) for research of the University of Tromsø. He will take up this function on August 1, 2013.
