= Molecular Query Language =

The Molecular Query Language (MQL) was designed to allow more complex, problem-specific search methods in chemoinformatics. In contrast to the widely used SMARTS queries, MQL provides for the specification of spatial and physicochemical properties of atoms and bonds. Additionally, it can easily be extended to handle non-atom-based graphs, also known as "reduced feature" graphs. The query language is based on an extended Backus–Naur form (EBNF) using JavaCC.

== Notes and references ==
- E. Proschak, J. K. Wegner, A. Schüller, G. Schneider, U. Fechner, Molecular Query Language (MQL)-A Context-Free Grammar for Substructure Matching, J. Chem. Inf. Model., 2007, 47, 295–301. doi:10.1021/ci600305h

== See also ==
- SMARTS
- International Chemical Identifier
