= ACES (computational chemistry) =

Chemistry software

Aces II (Advanced Concepts in Electronic Structure Theory) is an ab initio computational chemistry package for performing high-level quantum chemical ab initio calculations. Its major strength is the accurate calculation of atomic and molecular energies as well as properties using many-body techniques such as many-body perturbation theory (MBPT) and, in particular coupled cluster techniques to treat electron correlation. The development of ACES II began in early 1990 in the group of Professor Rodney J. Bartlett at the Quantum Theory Project (QTP) of the University of Florida in Gainesville. There, the need for more efficient codes had been realized and the idea of writing an entirely new program package emerged. During 1990 and 1991 John F. Stanton, Jürgen Gauß, and John D. Watts, all of them at that time postdoctoral researchers in the Bartlett group, supported by a few students, wrote the backbone of what is now known as the ACES II program package. The only parts which were not new coding efforts were the integral packages (the MOLECULE package of J. Almlöf, the VPROP package of P.R. Taylor, and the integral derivative package ABACUS of T. Helgaker, P. Jorgensen J. Olsen, and H.J. Aa. Jensen). The latter was modified extensively for adaptation with Aces II, while the others remained very much in their original forms.

Ultimately, two different versions of the program evolved. The first was maintained by the Bartlett group at the University of Florida, and the other (known as ACESII-MAB) was maintained by groups at the University of Texas, Universitaet Mainz in Germany, and ELTE in Budapest, Hungary. The latter is now called CFOUR.

Aces III is a parallel implementation that was released in the fall of 2008. The effort led to definition of a new architecture for scalable parallel software called the super instruction architecture. The design and creation of software is divided into two parts:

1. The algorithms are coded in a domain specific language called super instruction assembly language or SIAL, pronounced "sail" for easy communication.
2. The SIAL programs are executed by a MPMD parallel virtual machine called the super instruction processor or SIP.

The ACES III program consists of 580,000 lines of SIAL code of which 200,000 lines are comments, and 230,000 lines of C/C++ and Fortran of which 62,000 lines are comments. The latest version of the program was released on August 1, 2014.

== See also ==
- Quantum chemistry computer programs
