= Poul Jørgensen (chemist) =

Danish chemist (born 1944)

- Born: 2 March 1944 (age 82); Silkeborg, Denmark
- Scientific career
- Fields: Chemistry (Theoretical chemistry)
- Institutions: Aarhus University
- Doctoral advisor: Jan Linderberg

Poul Jørgensen (born 2 March 1944) is professor of chemistry at the Department of Chemistry, Aarhus University (AU), Denmark and director of the qLEAP Center for Theoretical Chemistry at AU, which was established in April 2012. Jørgensen has made seminal contributions to the field of electronic structure theory. He is also one of the main authors of the DALTON program and a member of the International Academy of Quantum Molecular Science.

== Research ==
Jørgensen's list of peer-reviewed publications contains numerous self-contained articles which, in many cases, have become central sources within the field of electronic structure theory. His areas of research have been diverse and include work on:

- multi-configurational self-consistent field (MCSCF) methods
- Lagrangian techniques for molecular property calculations and analytic derivatives
- time-independent and time-dependent linear and non-linear response function theory
- coupled cluster perturbation theory
- calculation of magnetic molecular properties using gauge invariant methods
- showing and explaining the divergence of Møller–Plesset perturbation theory
- benchmarking the accuracy of electronic structure models
- basis set extrapolation for accurate calculations of energies
- linear-scaling coupled cluster algorithms
- optimization algorithms for Hartree–Fock and Kohn–Sham theory
- localization of Hartree–Fock orbitals.

== Selected published works ==
Jørgensen has written more than 350 publications in peer-reviewed international journals, in addition to four books (3 co-authored and 1 edited),

- Helgaker, Trygve; Jørgensen, Poul; Olsen, Jeppe (2000). Molecular Electronic-Structure Theory. West Sussex, England: Wiley & Sons Ltd. ISBN 0471967556.
- Jørgensen, Poul; Simons, Jack, eds. (1986). Geometrical Derivatives of Energy Surfaces and Molecular Properties. NATO ASI series. Dordrecht, Netherlands: D. Reidel Publishing Company. ISBN 9027721769.
- Jørgensen, Poul; Oddershede, Jens (1982). Problems in Quantum Chemistry. Massachusetts, USA: Addison Wesley. ISBN 0201054868.
- Jørgensen, Poul; Simons, Jack (1981). Second Quantization Based Methods in Quantum Chemistry. New York, USA: Academic Press. ISBN 0124121969.

He had more than 19,000 citations and a h-index of 68 (according to ISI Web of Knowledge database).

He has also organized the "Sostrup Summer School - Quantum Chemistry and Molecular Properties" alongside Trygve Helgaker and Jeppe Olsen biannually since 1990.

== Academic career ==
Jørgensen's career has been outlined in a Special Issue of Advances in Quantum Chemistry

- 1972–73 PostDoc with Professor Yngve Öhrn in Florida
- 1974 PostDoc with Professor Jack Simons in Utah
- 1974–75 PostDoc with Professor V. McKoy in Pasadena
- 1976 Associate Professor of Chemistry, Aarhus University
- 2001 Professor of Chemistry, Aarhus University
- 2010 Advanced Research Professor of Chemistry, Aarhus University

=== Directorships ===
- 2004–07: Director of "Centre for Theoretical Chemistry", funded by the Danish Natural Science Research Council
- 2006–11: Director of "The Lundbeck Foundation Centre for Theoretical Chemistry" funded by the Lundbeck Foundation
- 2012–17: Director of "The qLEAP Centre for Theoretical Chemistry" funded by the European Research Council

== Awards ==
- Appointed "Knight of the Order of the Dannebrog" by the Queen of Denmark in 2010 for his outstanding contributions to science.
- Elected member of the International Academy of Quantum Molecular Science (2012).
- Awards for extraordinary scientific accomplishment by the International Conference of Computation Methods in Science and Engineering (ICCMSE) (2006).
- Honoured by Thomson Scientific and the Danish Library Association as the most cited author in chemistry in Denmark during the period 1990–2004.
- Rigmor and Carl Holst-Knudsens Videnskabspris, Aarhus University (1986).
