= David Weininger =

American chemist (1952–2016)

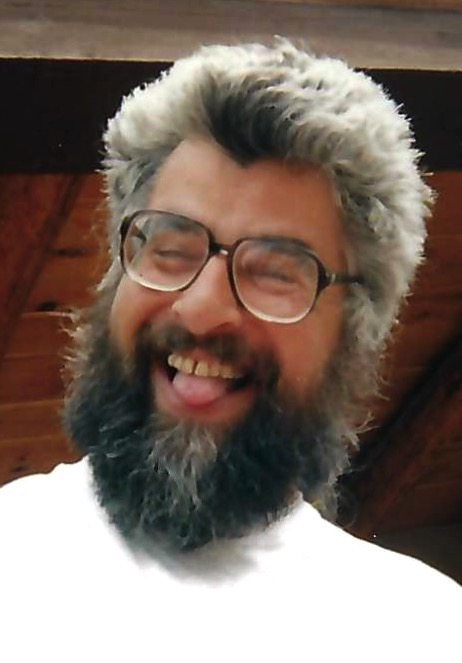
- Weininger in 1992
- Born: August 5, 1952; Brooklyn, New York, USA
- Died: November 2, 2016 (aged 64); Santa Fe, New Mexico, USA
- Education: University of Rochester, University of Bristol, University of Wisconsin–Madison
- Scientific career
- Fields: Cheminformatics, computational chemistry
- Institutions: United States Environmental Protection Agency; Pomona College; Daylight Chemical Information Systems

David Weininger (August 5, 1952 – November 2, 2016) was an American cheminformatician and entrepreneur. He was most notable for inventing the chemical line notations for structures (Simplified Molecular Input Line Entry System (SMILES)), substructures (SMILES arbitrary target specification (SMARTS)), reactions (Simplified Molecular Input Line Entry System (SMIRKS)), and for founding Daylight Chemical Information Systems, Inc.

== Education and career ==
Weininger studied at University of Rochester, first at the Eastman School of Music, then switched to chemistry. After graduation, he worked for General Electric in Canada, where he worked on water management. He then attended University of Wisconsin–Madison, where he graduated with a Doctor of Philosophy (PhD) in environmental engineering in 1978. His PhD project involves the study of polychlorinated biphenyls in Lake Michigan at the University of Wisconsin–Madison. He developed a computational model using data from the United States Environmental Protection Agency (EPA) using computer graphics algorithms, by then still a nascent field.

Upon graduation, he was hired by the EPA directly in its National Water Quality Laboratory in Duluth, Minnesota to develop similar models for other chemicals. During this period, Weininger started working with chemical databases which include structure-activity relationships. Weininger realized the difficulty to balance the IUPAC nomenclature for chemicals, used by human, and the Wiswesser line notation which was more efficient for computer processing. Weininger developed Simplified molecular-input line-entry system, or SMILES, such that it's easy for both humans and computers to understand.

Weininger moved to Pomona College in Claremont, California, working with Corwin Hansch and Albert Leo to work on the prediction of octanol-water partition coefficient (LogP) for molecules, which resulted in the software, cLogP, in 1983. The first publication on SMILES came out in 1988, while Weininger was affiliated with Pomona College.

In 1987, Weininger founded Daylight Chemical Information Systems, Inc. along with his brother Arthur Weininger and the business associate Yosi Taitz.

== Personal life ==
Weininger was born in Brooklyn, New York to Joseph and Marion Weininger as the eldest of three children, along with Arthur and Johanan. His father Joseph was from Austria and worked as a chemist in General Electric.

== Works mentioning Weininger ==
The Info Mesa: Science, Business, and New Age Alchemy on the Santa Fe Plateau by Ed Regis (author) was published in 2003, featuring Weininger and other leaders of informatics in the Santa Fe area.

== See also ==
- Corwin Hansch
- Anthony Nicholls (physicist)
