= Centre for Theoretical and Computational Chemistry =

The Centre for Theoretical and Computational Chemistry (CTCC) was founded by the Norwegian Research Council in 2007. The duration of the project is ten years. The CTCC is split in two units. One unit is located at the Department of Chemistry, University of Oslo (Leader: Prof. Trygve Helgaker), the other part is based at the Department of Chemistry, University of Tromsø (Leader: Prof. Kenneth Ruud). The CTCC is devoted to a wide range of research in the fields of theoretical and computational chemistry. One main focus is on method development in electronic structure theory. The CTCC is a key contributor to the Dalton (program) electronic structure program system. Another important topic of interest is the description of molecular dynamics with consideration of quantum effects. Applications of the electronic structure and molecular dynamics methods to chemical problems is another main occupation of researchers working at the CTCC.

== See also ==
- Center for Computational Chemistry
