= Martha Farah =

American cognitive neuroscientist

- Born: 1955 (age 70–71); New York City, USA

Academic background
- Education: SB, Metallurgy and Philosophy, Massachusetts Institute of Technology; PhD, 1983, Harvard University
- Thesis: The neural basis of mental images or the brain's mind's eye (1983)

Academic work
- Institutions: University of Pennsylvania; Carnegie Mellon University

Martha Julia Farah (born in 1955) is an American cognitive neuroscience researcher. She is the Walter H. Annenberg Professor of Natural Sciences and Director of the Center for Neuroscience & Society at the University of Pennsylvania. Farah has been elected a fellow of the American Association for the Advancement of Science, the Royal Society of Arts, British Academy for the Humanities and Social Sciences, and the American Academy of Arts and Sciences.

== Early life and education ==
Farah was born in 1955 in New York City. She received her Bachelor of Science degree in metallurgy and philosophy from the Massachusetts Institute of Technology (MIT) and her PhD in psychology from Harvard University.

== Career ==
Upon completing her PhD, Farah returned to MIT and the Boston University School of Medicine for her postdoctoral studies in neuropsychology. She then accepted an assistant professor position at Carnegie Mellon University. While at Carnegie Mellon, Farah wrote Visual Agnosia through MIT Press. In the book, she explored the neurological disorder known as visual agnosia by distinguishing between different types of visual agnosia and discussing their relevance to models of visual processing. Farah left Carnegie Mellon in 1993 to join the Department of Psychology at the University of Pennsylvania. Shortly after joining the department, Farah received the Troland Research Award and recognized by the American Psychological Association "for rigorous empirical and theoretical analysis of visual cognition." She was also awarded a Guggenheim Fellowship in 1995 and helped establish UPenn's Center for Cognitive Neuroscience. In 2005, Farah published a second edition of her book Visual Agnosia. However, she then began to shift her research focus towards the role childhood socioeconomic status played in neural development.

In May 2006, Farah and various colleagues founded the Neuroethics Society "to promote an international debate about the proper use of the discoveries in their field." She was also elected a Fellow of the American Association for the Advancement of Science. The following year, Farah was appointed the Walter H. Annenberg Professor of Natural Sciences. She also received the 2008 William James Fellow Award for her "lifetime of significant intellectual contributions to the basic science of psychology" and was elected a Fellow of the Royal Society of Arts. In 2010, Farah authored and published Neuroethics: An Introduction with Readings. She was also elected a Fellow of the American Academy of Arts and Sciences in 2010.

In 2018, Farah was named a Fellow of the British Academy for the Humanities and Social Sciences. In 2021, Farah was awarded the Howard Crosby Warren Medal by the Society of Experimental Psychologists for her "foundational cognitive neuroscientific work on face and object recognition, visual attention, mental imagery, and semantic memory and recent work investigating the influence of early life experience on neurocognitive development."

== See also ==
- Prosopagnosia
- Neuroethics
