= Seeing Is Believing: Handicams, Human Rights and the News =

- Directed by: Peter Wintonick; Katerina Cizek
- Written by: Peter Wintonick; Katerina Cizek
- Produced by: Francis Miquet; Katarina Cizek; Peter Wintonick
- Narrated by: Katerina Cizek
- Music by: Eric Lemoyne
- Production company: Necessary Illusions
- Release date: March 6, 2002 (Thessaloniki Documentary Festival)
- Running time: 60 minutes
- Country: Canada
- Language: English

Seeing Is Believing: Handicams, Human Rights and the News is a 2002 Canadian documentary film co-directed by Katerina Cizek and Peter Wintonick about the impact of camcorders and digital media on citizen media creation and grassroots democracy.

The one-hour documentary focuses on Joey Lozano, a videographer helping a tribe in the rural southern Philippines where business interests are taking precedence over human rights. It also looks at Serb atrocities in Bosnia, skinhead activity in Prague, and how portable cameras are used by police to film protesters. The film also explores the role of faxes in the Tiananmen Square uprising and the then-emerging use of text messaging in protests.
