= Darcy Padilla =

American narrative photographer and photojournalist

- Born: 1965 (age 60–61); Northern California, United States
- Education: San Francisco State University, University of California, Davis
- Occupation: Photojournalist
- Known for: "The Julie Project" and "Family Love"
- Awards: World Press Photo award for "Long Term Projects"
- Website: darcypadilla.com

Darcy Marie Padilla (born 1965) is an American narrative photographer and photojournalist who specializes in long-term narrative projects centering on social issues such as urban poverty, drug addiction and HIV/AIDS. She was a Guggenheim Fellow and the recipient of a W. Eugene Smith Award and three World Press Photo awards. She is best known for "The Julie Project" and its related series "Family Love", which both follow an impoverished young woman from 1993 until her death in 2010. Padilla has been a faculty member at University of Wisconsin–Madison since 2018.

== Personal background ==
Padilla was born in Vallejo, California and raised in Northern California. Her father was a Mexican immigrant and social worker and her mother worked in a hospital. Padilla took up photography at age 12 when she got her first SLR camera and was later editor for her school yearbook. She earned a BA in journalism from San Francisco State University and an MFA in studio art from University of California, Davis.

== Career ==
Padilla started her photography career as a photo intern at The Washington Post, then The New York Times. After three months, NYT offered her a permanent job, but she turned it down to pursue an independent career and her own documentary projects. She worked as a waitress and a retail clerk in the early days of her career to support herself. In 1990, Padilla started her first major project, "American Prisons," which featured prisoners in the AIDS ward of the state prison in Vacaville, California. A series from that project over the course of one year was awarded with a prize from the Alexia Foundation.

In the early 1990s, at the height of the AIDS epidemic, Padilla followed the nurses, doctors, and social workers working at the Ambassador Hotel in San Francisco, which was housing overflow patients from nearby hospitals. She was so moved by her experience that she later returned to photograph the residents she had met. This is where she met Julie Baird in 1993. Padilla photographed Julie Baird from the time they met until Julie's death from AIDS in September 2010. "The Julie Project" follows the life of Julie Baird through raising her family, dealing with HIV/AIDS, struggling with a drug addiction, and death. The project lasted 18 years. The first series took second place in the 2011 World Press Photo contemporary issues competition. The second series, "Family Love, 1993-2014," won the 2015 World Press Photo Award and was presented with 30 images. The book version, Family Love, was published in 2014.

In 2006, she photographed 50 successful African American and Latina women for the exhibition and bookVoices: African-American and Latina Women in Pennsylvania Share Their Stories of Success. This project was in conjugation with the Pennsylvania Commission for Women. In 2013, she was approached to join the Facing Change Documenting America project, wherein ten photojournalists would document "poverty, housing, immigration, racism, war, economic disparity and natural disasters" in the United States, inspired by the Farm Security Administration's photography program during World War II. She worked in the Mid-Market area of San Francisco, which she had been photographing since 1992. The project was released as a book in 2015.

In 2016, she documented the US presidential elections for Le Monde. In 2017, her longer-term project at the Pine Ridge Indian Reservation in South Dakota was displayed at the Visa pour l'Image festival. That year, she also appeared as a judge in the second season of Master of Photography on Sky Arts.

Padilla has taught photography at University of Wisconsin–Madison since 2018. Previously, she taught at the San Francisco Art Institute and University of California, Davis and lectured at Stanford University, Syracuse University, University of California, Berkeley, and at the Rencontres d'Arles festival. She is also a photographer for Agence Vu in Paris.

== Awards and honors ==
- 1995: John Simon Guggenheim Fellowship
- 1998: Open Society Foundations Fellow
- 2006: San Francisco Cultural Equity Award
- 2010: W. Eugene Smith Award, W. Eugene Smith Memorial Fund.
- 2010: Getty Images Grant
- 2011: World Press Photo competition, Second place in the Contemporary Issues category for "The Julie Project".
- 2012: World Press Photo competition, Honorable mention in the Daily Life category for Jason & Elyssa.
- 2013: Canon Female Photojournalist Grant
- 2014: PhotoReporter Festival Grant
- 2015: World Press Photo competition, First place in the Long Term Projects category for "The Julie Project".
- 2021: Françoise-Demulder Photography Grant
- 2024: RPS (The Royal Photographic Society) Award for Editorial or Documentary Photography

== Publications ==
- Family Love. Paris: Martinière, 2014. ISBN 978-2732464985. French-language edition.
