= Dalton (program) =

- Initial release: 1983
- Stable release: 2020 / 20 October 2020; 4 years ago
- Repository: gitlab.com/dalton/dalton
- Written in: Fortran
- Operating system: Linux
- Type: Ab initio quantum chemistry methods, Density functional theory
- License: GNU Lesser General Public License
- Website: daltonprogram.org

Dalton (named after John Dalton) is an ab initio quantum chemistry computer program suite, consisting of the Dalton and LSDalton programs. The Dalton suite is capable of calculating various molecular properties using the Hartree–Fock, MP2, MCSCF and coupled cluster theories. Version 2.0 of DALTON added support for density functional theory calculations. There are many authors, including Trygve Helgaker, Poul Jørgensen and Kenneth Ruud.

Dalton switched to the open source GNU LGPL licence in August 2017.

== See also ==
- Quantum chemistry software
- Centre for Theoretical and Computational Chemistry
