= Catherine Craig (conservationist) =

American zoologist

- Born: February 2, 1951 (age 75); Oxnard, California, U.S.
- Education: Stanford University (BA); University of California, Berkeley (MS); Cornell University (PhD)
- Awards: Guggenheim Fellowship (1995)
- Scientific career
- Fields: Spider silk
- Workplaces: Yale University; Conservation through Poverty Alleviation International

Catherine L. Craig (born February 2, 1951) is an American zoologist and conservationist. She is a 1995 Guggenheim Fellow and is founder of Conservation through Poverty Alleviation International.

== Biography ==
Craig was born on February 2, 1951, in Oxnard, California, and raised on a citrus farm in Ventura. While studying at Stanford University, Craig studied chimpanzee ethology at Gombe Stream National Park for six months starting in 1972, working alongside Jane Goodall; her experience there inspired her to study silk, seeing it as a way for people to protect habitats with limited financial options. She obtained a BA in human biology from Stanford in 1973, and later a MS in zoology from the University of California, Berkeley in 1976.

In 1985, Craig obtained a PhD from Cornell University; her doctoral dissertation Predator-Prey Dynamics: The Role of Spider and Insect Ecological and Behavioral Interactions in the Evolution of the Araneoidea was supervised by Simon A. Levin. She became an assistant professor of biology at Yale University in 1985, before being promoted to associate professor in 1991. By 1990, she had made several visits to Panama as part of scientific studies funded by the National Geographic Society, National Science Foundation, and the Smithsonian Institution.

Craig studied wild silk throughout Asia and Africa, before selecting Madagascar for its biodiversity and high poverty. In 2003, she founded Conservation through Poverty Alleviation International (CPALI), an NGO meant to build an economy on silk through training, tree planting, and plant finding, though it encountered challenges such as shipping costs, resource constraints, and other logistical issues. She then started fieldwork on that country in 2004, centering on farmers at border forests with wild silk caterpillars; this provided a model centered on people's landscapes instead of moving people out. She used a 2007-2008 Fulbright Program grant to extend the work of CPALI in Madagascar.

In 1995, Craig was awarded a Guggenheim Fellowship "for a study of silk proteins and the evolution of web-spinning spiders". She was also a 1992 Alfred P. Sloan Foundation Fellow and a 1995-1996 Mary Ingraham Bunting Institute Fellow.

She is the author of two books: Spider Webs and Silk and Spider Silk.
