= Josef Paldus =

Canadian chemist (1935–2023)

- Born: November 25, 1935; Bzí, Czech Republic
- Died: January 15, 2023 (aged 87); Kitchener, Ontario, Canada
- Known for: Work in quantum chemistry
- Scientific career
- Fields: Applied Mathematics

Josef Paldus, FRSC (November 25, 1935 – January 15, 2023) was a Czech-born Canadian theoretical chemist who was a Distinguished Professor Emeritus of Applied Mathematics at the University of Waterloo, Ontario, Canada.

Paldus became associate professor at the University of Waterloo after emigration to Canada from (former) Czechoslovakia in 1968. In 1975 he was promoted to full professor at this university, and he retired in 2001.

Paldus' research was mainly in the field of quantum chemistry and especially in the mathematical aspects of it. He is known for his collaborative work with Jiří Čížek on coupled cluster theory. Paldus and Čížek adapted the many-body coupled cluster method to many-electron systems, thus making it a viable method in the study of the electronic correlation that occurs in atoms and molecules.

Other well-known work by Paldus is the Unitary Group Approach. This approach regards the computation of Hamiltonian matrix elements over N-electron spin eigenstates that appear in electronic correlation problems.

Paldus (co)authored over 330 scientific papers.

Paldus possessed several doctoral degrees: In 1961 he received a PhD in Physical Chemistry at the Czechoslovak Academy of Sciences. In 1995 he became DrSc at the Charles University in Prague. In June 2006 he became Dr.h.c. at the Comenius University in Bratislava and in June 2008 he was awarded the honorary degree Docteur Honoris Causa by the Université Louis Pasteur in Strasbourg, France.

Paldus died in Kitchener on January 15, 2023, at the age of 87.

Other honors received by Paldus are inter alia:

- 1981 Corresponding Member of the European Academy of Sciences, Arts and Letters, Paris.
- 1983 Fellow of the Royal Society of Canada.
- 1984 Member of the International Academy of Quantum Molecular Science.
- 1985 Member of the New York Academy of Sciences.
- 1990 Member of the Board of Directors, International Society for Theoretical Chemical Physics.
- 1992 J. Heyrovský Gold Medal of the Czechoslovak Academy of Sciences.
- 1994 Gold Medal of the Faculty of Mathematics and Physics, Comenius University, Bratislava, Slovakia.
- 1995 Honorary Member of The Learned Society of the Czech Republic.
- 2002 Fellow of the Fields Institute for Research in Mathematical Sciences.
- 2005 Gold Medal of Charles University.
- 2007 Honorary Medal De Scientia et Humanitate Optime Meritis of the Academy of Sciences of the Czech Republic, Prague, Czech Republic.
- 2010 Honorary Fellowship of the European Society of Computational Methods in Sciences and Engineering.
- 2013 Fellow of the American Institute of Physics.

== See also ==
- List of University of Waterloo people
