= Anthony Nicholls (physicist) =

British scientist and software developer

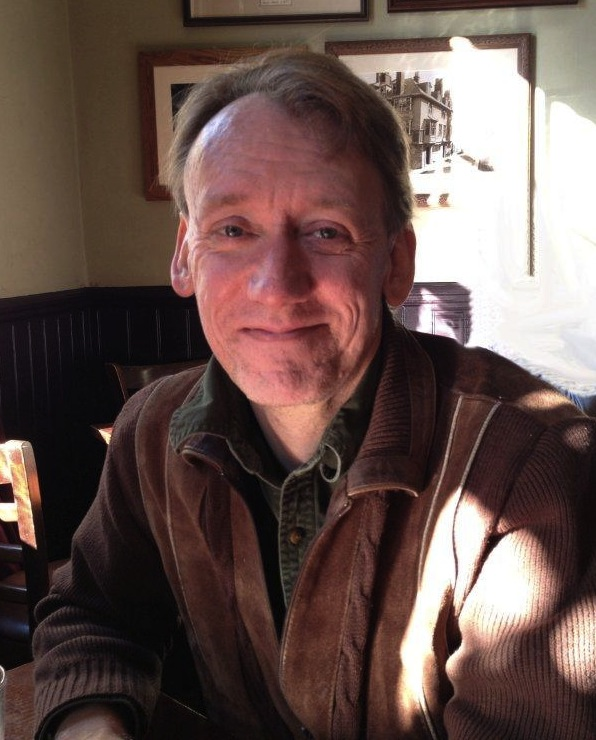
- Nicholls in 2013
- Born: Plympton, Plymouth, England
- Education: University of Oxford, Florida State University (Ph.D.), Columbia University (postdoc)
- Known for: DelPhi rewrite Graphical Representation and Analysis of Structural Properties (GRASP); OpenEye Scientific Software (founder)
- Scientific career
- Fields: physics, chemistry, molecular biophysics
- Workplaces: Florida State University, OpenEye Scientific Software, Worldwide Protein Data Bank
- Thesis: (1988)
- Doctoral advisor: William Rhodes
- Other academic advisors: Barry Honig

Anthony (Ant) Nicholls is a physicist and entrepreneur from Plympton, Plymouth, England. He was also chair of the Worldwide Protein Data Bank.

== Education ==
Nicholls was educated at Plympton Grammar School and then from 1979 to 1982 studied physics at the University of Oxford before joining the Institute for molecular biophysics at Florida State University. There he studied quantum dispersion of excitations in biological systems with William Rhodes, and in football with coach Bobby Bowden. He earned his Doctor of Philosophy (Ph.D.) in biophysics in 1988 and began as a postdoctoral researcher (postdoc) with Barry Honig at Columbia University, New York City.

== Software development ==
Nicholls has worked mainly in molecular biophysics, designing software that is used in drug discovery uses.

While at Columbia University, he re-wrote the electrostatics program named DelPhi. DelPhi took input from a coordinate file format of a molecule and calculated the electrostatic potential in and around the system, using a finite difference solution to the Poisson–Boltzmann equation.

Nicholls later wrote the graphics software Graphical Representation and Analysis of Structural Properties (GRASP). GRASP is a graphics program written for Silicon Graphics computers that was used by the structural biology community to visualize macromolecules. It was the most widely used software for computing and displaying polyhedral molecular surfaces during the 1990s.

== Business ==
Work conducted on DelPhi and GRASP continues to be the intellectual property of Columbia University. As a result, Nicholls consulted with David Weininger, and decided in 1997 to found OpenEye Scientific Software in Santa Fe, New Mexico. Nicholls has been termed the "Steve Jobs of the Info Mesa" regarding his work at OpenEye. OpenEye has employed several notable people in cheminformatics, including RasMol developer Roger Sayle. OpenEye was acquired by Cadence Design Systems in September 2022. In early 2025, Nicholls announced his retirement from OpenEye.

Nicholls was also Chair of the Worldwide Protein Data Bank.
