= OpenEye Scientific Software =

American molecular modelling software company

- Type: Subsidiary
- Industry: Computer software; Research and development; Biotechnology; Cheminformatics
- Founded: 1997; 29 years ago
- Founder: Anthony Nicholls
- Headquarters: Santa Fe, New Mexico, United States
- Key people: Anthony Nicholls (CEO)
- Number of employees: 130 (2022)
- Parent: Cadence Design Systems
- Website: www.eyesopen.com

OpenEye Scientific Software is an American software company founded by Anthony Nicholls in 1997. It develops large-scale molecular modelling applications and toolkits. Following OpenEye's acquisition by Cadence Design Systems for $500 million in September 2022, the company was rebranded to OpenEye Cadence Molecular Sciences and operates as a business unit under Cadence.

== Scope ==
Primarily geared towards drug discovery and design, areas of application include conformation generation, docking, shape comparison, charge/electrostatics, cheminformatics and visualization. The software is designed for scientific rigor, as well as speed, scalability and platform independence.

OpenEye makes much of its technology available as toolkits suitable for custom development. The toolkits are available in multiple languages: C++, Python, Java and C#.

== Application software ==
- AFITT - Crystallographic refinement and analysis.
- BROOD - Bioisostere identification using shape, chemistry and electrostatic similarity.
- EON - Chemical similarity analysis via comparison of electrostatics overlay.
- FastROCS - Real-time 3D molecular shape searches, using GPU technology.
- FILTER - Molecular screening and selection based on physical property or functional group.
- OEDocking - Molecular docking tools including FRED (fast docking), HYBRID (ligand guided docking) and POSIT (ligand guided pose prediction).
- OMEGA - Fast, accurate conformer generation, for linear and macrocyclic molecules.
- pKa Prospector - A database of high quality pKa measurements.
- QUACPAC - Tautomers, protonation states and charges for small molecules and proteins.
- ROCS - Chemical similarity analysis via rapid 3D molecular shape searches.
- SZMAP - Identify water sites in a protein binding site for improving ligand potency.
- SZYBKI - Fast forcefield optimization of ligands in gas-phase, solution, or within a protein active site.
- VIDA - Graphical user interface that visualizes, analyzes and manages corporate collections of molecular structures and information.

== Toolkits ==
Programming libraries providing wider applications with object-oriented accessibility to a given set of capabilities.

- OEChem TK - Core molecule handling, cheminformatics and 3D molecular data handling.
- Bioisostere TK - 3D fragment replacement.
- OEDepict TK - 2D molecule rendering and depiction.
- OEDocking TK - Molecular docking and scoring.
- OEFF TK - Molecule objective functions, adaptors and optimizers.
- Grapheme TK - Render complex 3D information into 2D for simplified analysis.
- GraphSim TK - 2D molecular fingerprints and similarity calculations.
- EON TK - 3D electrostatics description, optimization and overlap comparisons.
- FastROCS TK - extremely fast shape comparisons.
- Lexichem TK - State-of-the-art compound name and structure interconversion with support for multiple foreign languages.
- MolProp TK - Molecular property calculation and filtering.
- MedChem TK - Matched molecular pair analysis, fragmentation utilities, and molecular complexity metrics.
- Quacpac TK - Tautomer enumeration and charge assignment.
- Omega TK - Rapid, accurate conformer generation.
- Shape TK - 3D molecular shape description, optimization and overlap comparisons.
- Sitehopper TK - Rapid binding site comparison, GPU enabled.
- Spicoli TK - Rapid molecular surface generation, manipulation and interrogation.
- Spruce TK - Protein preparation and modeling.
- Szmap TK - Understanding water interactions in a protein binding site.
- Szykbi TK - Molecular energetics with forcefields. Generalized function optimization, e.g. molecular structure optimization.
- Zap TK - An efficient Poisson-Boltzmann electrostatics solver.

== See also ==
- Computational chemistry
