= Kersti Hermansson =

Professor for Inorganic Chemistry

Kersti Hermansson (born in 1951) is a Professor for Inorganic Chemistry at Uppsala University.

== Education and professional career ==
She did her PhD on "The Electron Distribution in the Bound Water Molecule" in 1984. From 1984 to 1986, she had a postdoctoral fellowship from the Swedish Research Council with Dr. E. Clementi at IBM-Kingston, USA. From 1986–1988, she was a Högskolelektor in Inorganic Chemistry at Uppsala University. In 1988, she was a docent of Inorganic Chemistry at Uppsala University. In 1996, she was a Biträdande professor. Since 2000, she is a professor of Inorganic Chemistry at Uppsala University. During this time (2008-2013), she was a part-time guest professor at KTH Stockholm.

== Research ==
Her research focuses on condensed-matter chemistry including the investigation of chemical bonding and development of quantum chemical methods.

== Awards ==
She received several prizes for her research:

- "Letterstedska priset" from the Swedish Royal Academy of Sciences (KVA) (1987)
- "Oskarspriset" from Uppsala University (1988)
- "Norblad-Ekstrand" medal in gold from the Swedish Chemical Society (2003)
- Member of Kungl. Vetenskapssamhället (Academia regia scientiarum Upsaliensis, KVSU), Uppsala (since 1988)
- Member of Royal Society of Science (since 2002)
- Member of Royal Swedish Academy of Sciences (since 2007)
- Adjunct professor at the Kasetsart University, Bangkok (2005)
- Honorary guest professor at the Department of Ion Physics and Applied Physics, Innsbruck University (since June 2009)
