= State-universal coupled cluster =

State-universal coupled cluster (SUCC) method is one of several multi-reference coupled-cluster (MR) generalizations of single-reference coupled cluster method. It was first formulated by Bogumił Jeziorski and Hendrik Monkhorst in their work published in Physical Review A in 1981. State-universal coupled cluster is often abbreviated as SUMR-CC or MR-SUCC.
