= DelPhi =

Scientific application

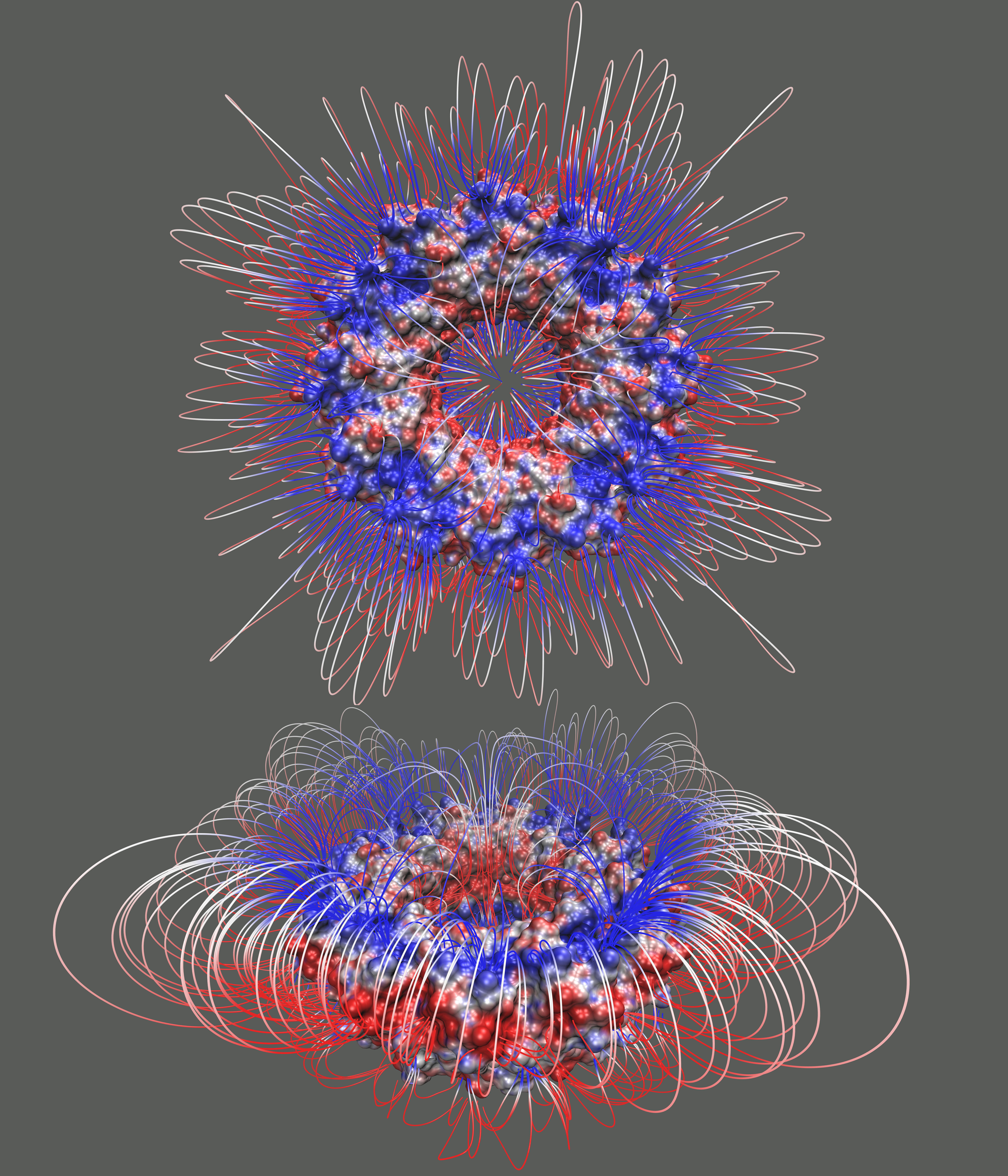
- The electrostatic field lines of TRAP---trp RNA binding attenuation protein (PDB ID: 2EXS). The blue and red colors represent the positive and negative polarities, respectively. The field lines indicate the directions of the electrostatic forces surrounding the protein.
- Original author: Barry Honig
- Developer: DelPhi Development Team
- Operating system: Linux, Mac OS X, Microsoft Windows
- Website: compbio.clemson.edu/delphi

DelPhi is a scientific application which calculates electrostatic potentials in and around macromolecules and the corresponding electrostatic energies. It incorporates the effects of ionic strength mediated screening by evaluating the Poisson-Boltzmann equation at a finite number of points within a three-dimensional grid box. DelPhi is commonly used in protein science to visualize variations in electrostatics along a protein or other macromolecular surface and to calculate the electrostatic components of various energies.

== Development ==
One of the main problems in modeling the electrostatic potential of biological macromolecules is that they exist in water at a given ionic strength and that they have an irregular shape. Analytical solutions of the corresponding Poisson-Boltzmann Equation (PBE) are not available for such cases and the distribution of the potential can be found only numerically. DelPhi, developed in Professor Barry Honig's lab in 1986, was the first PBE solver used by many researchers. The widespread popularity of DelPhi is due to its speed, accuracy (calculation of the electrostatic free energy is only slightly dependent on the resolution of the grid) and the ability to handle extremely high grid dimensions.

== Features ==
Additional features such as assigning different dielectric constants to different regions of space, smooth Gaussian-based dielectric distribution function, modeling geometric objects and charge distributions, and treating systems containing mixed salt solutions also attracted many researchers. In addition to the typical potential map, DelPhi can generate and output the calculated distribution of either the dielectric constant or ion concentration, providing the biomedical community with extra tools for their research.

Pdb files are typically used as input for DelPhi calculations. Other required inputs are an atomic radii file and a charge file. Binary Potential files as output from DelPhi can be viewed in most molecular viewers such as UCSF Chimera, Jmol, and VMD, and can either be mapped onto surfaces or visualized at a fixed cutoff.

== Versions ==
Delphi distribution comes as a sequential as well as parallelized codes, runs on Linux, Mac OS X and Microsoft Windows systems and the source code is available in Fortran 95 and C++ programming languages. DELPHI is also implemented into an accessible web-server. DELPHI has also been utilized to build a server that predicts pKa's of biological macromolecules such as proteins, RNAs and DNAs which can be accessed via web.

DelPhi v.7 is distributed in four versions:

1. IRIX version, compiled under IRIX 6.5 Operating System, 32bits, using f77 and cc compilers.
2. IRIX version, compiled under IRIX 6.5 Operating System, 64bits, using f77 and cc compilers.
3. LINUX version, compiled under Red Hat 7.1, kernel 2.4.2 Operating System, using GNU gfortran compilers,
4. PC version, compiled under Windows Operating System, using Microsoft Developer Studio C++ and Fortran compilers.

Their way of working is very similar; however, unexpected differences may appear due to different numerical precision or to the porting of the software to different architectures. For example, the elapsed time in the PC version is not calculated at present.

Each distribution contains one executable (named delphi or delphi.exe), the source codes (with corresponding makefile when needed), and some worked examples.

== See also ==
- Anthony Nicholls (physicist)
