= Mary S. Lewis =

American musicologist (1934–2017)

- Born: July 25, 1934; New York City, U.S.
- Died: October 28, 2017 (aged 83)
- Occupation: Musicologist
- Awards: Guggenheim Fellowship (1995)

Academic background
- Education: Mary Baldwin College; Columbia University; Simmons College; Brandeis University
- Thesis: Antonio Gardane and His Publications of Sacred Music, 1538-55 (1979)

Academic work
- Discipline: Musicology
- Institutions: Massachusetts Institute of Technology; Brown University; University of Pittsburgh

Mary Stuart Lewis (July 25, 1934 – October 28, 2017) was an American musicologist. A 1995 Guggenheim Fellow, she published the three-volume series Antonio Gardano, Venetian Music Printer, 1538-1569 from 1988 to 2007. She was a professor at Brown University and the University of Pittsburgh.

== Biography ==
Lewis was born on July 25, 1934, in New York City. She attended Mary Baldwin College, where she got her Bachelor of Arts degree in 1954, and Columbia University, where she got her Master of Arts degree in 1958. She later obtained her Master of Science degree from Simmons College in 1970 and her doctor of philosophy degree from Brandeis University in 1979. Her doctoral dissertation was titled Antonio Gardane and His Publications of Sacred Music, 1538-55.

Originally working as a music instructor and research associate at Massachusetts Institute of Technology since 1977, Lewis moved to Brown University as an assistant professor of music in 1981. After moving to the University of Pittsburgh in 1987, she was promoted to associate professor in 1993. She was also Pitt's first woman music faculty member to be tenured. She eventually became professor emerita at Pitt.

As a musicologist, Lewis specialized in Renaissance music, as well as the publishing side of music. In 1988, she released the first volume of Antonio Gardano, Venetian Music Printer, 1538-1569, a catalogue of the works of the Renaissance composer-printer of the same name, with the next two volumes released in 1997 and 2005; she won the Music Library Association's 2007 Vincent H. Duckles Award for the series. She later published Sources and the Circulation of Renaissance Music, a 2012 edited volume on the production and historical role of Renaissance music. She also served as council secretary of the American Musicological Society from 1987 to 1991, as well as president of the AMS' New England chapter from 1984 to 1986.

In 1995, Lewis was awarded a Guggenheim Fellowship to study Renaissance composer-printer Antonio Gardano. She also received grants from the American Council of Learned Societies (1980 and 1987), The Gladys Krieble Delmas Foundation (1980–1981), the American Philosophical Society (1985), the Bibliographical Society of America (1986), and the National Endowment for the Humanities (1995).

Lewis had four children, all of whom she raised while she was doing her graduate studies.

Lewis died on October 28, 2017.

== Bibliography ==
- Antonio Gardano, Venetian Music Printer, 1538-1569 (three volumes; 1988, 1997, and 2005)
