= Cédric Gerbehaye =

Belgian journalist, photographer (born 1977)

Cédric Gerbehaye (born 1977) is a Belgian documentary photographer and a founding member of MAPS Agency. He is the author of the books Congo in Limbo, Land of Cush, Sète#13 and D’entre eux.

== Career ==
Trained as a journalist, Gerbehaye first turned to photography during trips to Indonesia. For his graduation thesis in 2002, he addressed the Israeli-Palestinian conflict in the light of the ineffectiveness of the Oslo Accords. After completing his studies, he reported on the situation in Hebron and Gaza and on the economic crisis in Israel. He has also covered the Kurdish question in Turkey and Iraq. Since 2007, he has reported on the conflicts between the militias and the national army in the eastern Congo.

His work in the Congo was facilitated by the humanitarian organization Aviation sans frontières which flew him into rebel zones and camps in the Ituri and North Kivu provinces where he was able to photograph adults and children involved in both sides of the conflict. He also travelled to remote areas with Médecins Sans Frontières where he reported mainly on the victims, rather than on the violence. "I’m not looking for the combat," he explained. "I’m interested in trying to tell the story of the people." Keen to bring unreported disasters into the open, he thinks of himself as a "concerned photographer". (Note: Cornell Capa "chose the phrase 'concerned photographer' to describe those photographers who demonstrated in their work a humanitarian impulse to use pictures to educate and change the world, not just to record it." "Cornell Capa: Concerned Photographer", International Center of Photography. Retrieved 28 December 2021.) "If there is only a slight possibility that it has an impact, it’s my duty to do it so that people cannot say, 'We didn’t know, we had no clue.'"

== Awards ==
- 2006: Prix Photographie Ouverte (Musée de la photographie de Charleroi, two awards)
- 2007: Bayeux-Calvados Awards for war correspondents, for Summer Rains
- 2008: World Press Photo Award, for Congo in Limbo
- 2008: The Olivier Rebbot Award (Overseas Press Club of America), for Congo in Limbo
- 2008: Amnesty International Media Award, for Congo in Limbo
