= Annabella Selloni =

- Born: September 28, 1951 (age 74); Sardinia, Italy
- Education: Universitá La Sapienza, Swiss Federal Institute of Technology (1970-1974) (PhD, 1974-1979)
- Scientific career
- Fields: Chemistry, physics, theoretical chemistry
- Workplaces: Princeton University, Shinshu University
- Website: http://chemlabs.princeton.edu/selloni/

Annabella Selloni is the David B. Jones Professor of Chemistry at Princeton University.

== Education ==
Selloni completed studies at the Universitá La Sapienza in 1970-1974 and received her PhD from the Swiss Federal Institute of Technology in Lausanne in 1979.

== Career and research ==
Selloni works on theoretical chemistry, determining electronic and other properties of materials that are of interest for energy applications. She carries out complex quantum-mechanical computations.

Her research has covered density functional theory investigations into the effects of surface chemistry on water electrocatalysis, modelling of biomaterials capable of purifying water of heavy metals, and studying the interaction between organic and inorganic layers in self-cleaning titanium dioxide.

Selloni returned to La Sapienza as an assistant professor in 1982, working in the incipient field of scanning tunneling microscopy (STM). Back then researchers were simply trying to understand the images they were seeing, and these questions formed the bulk of her work at La Sapienza: what are the images representing, what are the traces, what is the geometry of the atoms that are being probed? In 1985, she published a paper on voltage-dependent STM that discussed the possible application of STM to surface electronic spectroscopy.

Her collaborators include Prof. Cristiana Di Valentin at the University of Milano-Bicocca.

== Awards and honors ==
In 2008 she was awarded the status of Fellow in the American Physical Society, after being nominated by the Division of Computational Physics for her pioneering first-principles computational studies of surfaces and interfaces. Made possible the interpretation of complex experiments, and successfully predicted the physical, and chemical properties of broad classes of materials, including materials for photovoltaic applications. She received the Fellow of the European Academy of Sciences in 2016 for the same reason.

She was awarded the Max Planck Fellowship, a research funding program offered by the Max Planck Society, providing predoctoral fellowships to researchers for up to six months. This program is designed to support PhD candidates and researchers at all stages of their academic journey.

=== Other awards ===
- J. D. Lindsay Lectures Speaker at Texas A&M University (Fall 2012)
- Fellow of the American Physical Society (2008)

== Early life ==
Selloni was born in Sardinia, Italy on September 28, 1951. Her family moved often from the time she was five years old, living at one point in her mother’s childhood town on the Adriatic Sea before finally settling in Rome where she spent her formative years. She is the daughter of an engineer and a homemaker while also being the middle child of 3. Selloni’s had an aptitude for math, evident from a very young age. By the time she graduated from high school in Rome, she was fascinated by the deep fundamental questions of physics.

“It was always so clear to me what I wanted to do,” she said. “I’m surprised at myself because I’m very doubtful for many things. But it was so clear that I wanted to stay in research from a very young age. I had no doubt. It was automatic. I went straight to it.”

She moved onto the Universitá La Sapienza in 1970 and received her PhD from the Swiss Federal Institute of Technology in Lausanne in 1979.

== See also ==
- List of fellows of the American Physical Society (1998–2010)
