= Olivia Lucia Carrescia =

American independent filmmaker

- Born: March 29, 1944 (age 82)

Olivia Lucia Carrescia (born March 29, 1944) is an American independent filmmaker best known for her documentary trilogy on the indigenous Maya of Todos Santos Cuchumatán, a traditional village in highland Guatemala. The films have been distributed internationally and purchased by Latin American Studies Departments of every major university in the United States.

Carrescia was awarded a John Simon Guggenheim Memorial Fellowship in filmmaking in 1995. She has received three NYFA Fellowships and numerous grants from NYSCA, the American Film Institute, the Jerome Foundation, the Open Society Foundations and others.

== Life and career ==
Carrescia was born in Brooklyn, New York. Both her parents were Italian immigrants. She received a Bachelor of Fine Arts in Fine Art and Graphic Art at The Cooper Union School of Art and Architecture. After one year as an assistant to graphic designer George Tscherny and another year as assistant art director at an advertising agency, she left for Europe. She studied Spanish language and culture in Spain, the Italian language and culture in Italy, and later worked in Florence after the 1966 Flood of the Arno river.

In 1969 while working at the Rizzoli Bookstore on Fifth Avenue in New York City, Carrescia - because of her knowledge of Italian - was asked to work on an international feature film. She was trained as a Production Office Coordinator by Gray Frederickson, who would later become a producer of The Godfather films. After completion of production, she returned to Rome, Italy and spent several years working on Italian-American-French co-productions such as Once Upon a Time in the West and The Godfather, Part I and II.

From 1976-78, she worked as a researcher, line producer and translator on cultural documentaries for RAI, BBC, and the award winning children's television program, Big Blue Marble, in the United States, Europe and Latin America.

In 1978, while at Big Blue Marble, Carrescia traveled to Guatemala to produce a segment about a “Mayan Mountain Child”. After scouting indigenous villages throughout Guatemala, she visited Todos Santos Cuchumatán, a traditional highland village at 9,000 feet above sea level. The segment produced was only five minutes long, but the indigenous people and the exquisite location left a deep and lasting impression. She left her job at Big Blue Marble to produce her first independent documentary film. She was inspired by ethnographic filmmakers such as David and Judith MacDougall, Robert H. Gardner and Alan Lomax. Because of its striking cinematography and social, political and ethnographic content, her model for the first Todos Santos film was The Tree of Wooden Clogs, a feature film by Italian filmmaker Ermanno Olmi (O. L. Carrescia, personal communication, October 26, 2014).

Todos Santos Cuchumatán was shot on 16 mm film in November 1979. In January 1980 an attack on the Spanish Embassy in Guatemala by the Guatemalan military, led to increased violence and a greater interest in Guatemala and its political situation. Carrescia's film received finishing funds from the New York State Council on the Arts, the Jerome Foundation and The Film Fund. It was completed in September 1982 and premiered at the Margaret Mead Film Festival at the Museum of Natural History.

In 1985, after the election of Guatemala’s first democratic president in over 30 years, she was able to return to Todos Santos to research the effect of the devastating violence on this once isolated village. Todos Santos: The Survivors was completed in 1989. The third film of the Todos Santos-trilogy, Mayan Voices: American Lives (1994), explores the everyday life of Mayan refugees who settled in Indiantown, Florida.

After several years, during which Carrescia obtained a Master's degree in elementary education, she returned to Guatemala to document the work of Guatemala Forensic Anthropology Foundation (FAFG). The result was Sacred Soil (2008) about the ongoing search for remains of indigenous people massacred during the political violence of the 1980s.

In 2009, Carrescia returned to Todos Santos for what would become her last film to date. A Better Life: Una Vida Mejor (2011) documents the social, political and economic changes which have taken place in Todos Santos Cuchumatan more than thirty years after her first visit to the village.

Olivia Lucia Carrescia is currently a teaching artist with non-profit arts organizations in New York City.

== Awards and Fellowships ==
- 1983 American Film and Video Festival, Blue Ribbon, Anthropology and Ethnography (Todos Santos Cuchumatán)
- 1984 Creative Artists Public Service Grant (CAPS Fellowship)
- 1990 American Film and Video Festival Blue Ribbon, International Issues (Todos Santos: The Survivors)
- 1991 Latin American Studies Association Award of Merit (Todos Santos: The Survivors)
- 1994 Latin American Studies Association Award of Merit, (Mayan Voices: American Lives)
- 1995 Guggenheim Memorial Fellowship, Category Creative Arts, Field of Study: Film
- 2003 David J. Fox Memorial Award for Excellence in Education Research, CCNY

== Filmography ==
- Todos Santos Cuchumatán (1982)
- Central America Meets the Caribbean (1984)
- Todos Santos: The Survivors (1989)
- Mayan Voices: American Lives (1994)
- Diamonds in the Dark (1999)
- Dan's Class (2000)
- Sacred Soil (2008)
- A Better Life: Una Vida Mejor (2011)
