= Yousef Saad =

American mathematician

- Born: 1950 (age 75–76); Algiers, Algeria
- Education: University of Grenoble; University of Algiers
- Scientific career
- Fields: Computer science
- Workplaces: University of Minnesota

Yousef Saad (born 1950) in Algiers, Algeria from Boghni, Tizi Ouzou is an I.T. Distinguished Professor of Computer Science in the Department of Computer Science and Engineering at the University of Minnesota. He holds the William Norris Chair for Large-Scale Computing since January 2006. He is known for his contributions to the matrix computations, including the iterative methods for solving large sparse linear algebraic systems, eigenvalue problems, and parallel computing. He is listed as an ISI highly cited researcher in mathematics, is the most cited author in the journal Numerical Linear Algebra with Applications, and is the author of the highly cited book Iterative Methods for Sparse Linear Systems. He is a SIAM fellow (class of 2010) and a fellow of the AAAS (2011).

In 2023, he won the John von Neumann Prize.

== Education and career ==
Coming from a Kabyle family originally from Boghni, in Tizi Ouzou, Saad received his B.S. degree in mathematics from the University of Algiers, Algeria in 1970. He then joined University of Grenoble for the doctoral program and obtained a junior doctorate, 'Doctorat de troisieme cycle' in 1974 and a higher doctorate, 'Doctorat d’Etat' in 1983. During the course of his academic career, he has held various positions, including Research Scientist in the Computer Science Department at Yale University (1981–1983), Associate Professor in the University of Tizi-Ouzou in Algeria (1983–1984), Research Scientist at the Computer Science Department at Yale University (1984–1986), and Associate Professor in the Mathematics Department at University of Illinois at Urbana-Champaign (1986–1988). He also worked as a Senior Scientist in the Research Institute for Advanced Computer Science (RIACS) during 1980–1990.

Saad joined University of Minnesota as a Professor in the Department of Computer Science in 1990. At Minnesota, he held the position of Head of the Department of Computer Science and Engineering between January 1997 and June 2000. Currently, he is the I. T. Distinguished Professor of Computer Science at University of Minnesota.

== Books ==
Saad is the author of a couple of influential books in linear algebra and matrix computation which include

- Numerical Methods for Large Eigenvalue Problems, Halstead Press, 1992.
- Iterative Methods for Sparse Linear Systems, 2nd ed., Society for Industrial and Applied Mathematics, Philadelphia, 2003.

He has also co-edited the following article collections:

- D. L. Boley, D. G. Truhlar, Y. Saad, R. E. Wyatt, and L. E. Collins, Practical Iterative Methods for Large Scale Computations. North Holland, Amsterdam, 1989.
- D. E. Keyes, Y. Saad, and D. G. Truhlar, Domain-Based Parallelism and Problem Decomposition Methods in Computational Science and Engineering. SIAM, Philadelphia, 1995.
- A. Ferreira, J. Rolim, Y. Saad, and T. Yang, Parallel Algorithms for Irregularly Structured Problems, Proceedings of Third International Workshop, IRREGULAR’96 Santa Barbara, CA USA, 1996. Lecture Notes in Computer Science, No 1117. Springer Verlag, 1996.
- M. W. Berry, K. A. Gallivan, E. Gallopoulos, A. Grama, B. Philippe, Y. Saad, and F. Saied, High-Performance Scientific Computing: Algorithms and Applications. Springer, 2012.
