= James R. Chelikowsky =

American Professor

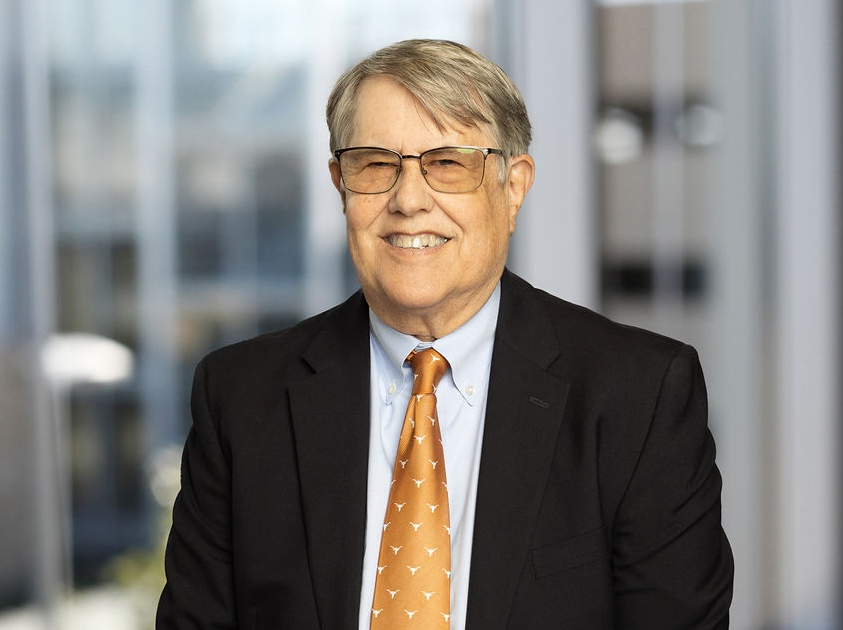
- Education: Kansas State University, University of California at Berkeley (Ph.D)
- Scientific career
- Fields: Computational Materials
- Workplaces: The University of Texas at Austin

James R. Chelikowsky is a professor of physics, chemical engineering, and chemistry at The University of Texas at Austin. He is the director of the Center for Computational Materials at the Oden Institute for Computational Engineering and Sciences at UT Austin. He holds the W.A. "Tex" Moncrief Jr. Chair of Computational Materials.

== Career ==
Chelikowsky is known for his research on the optical and dielectric properties of semiconductors, surface and interfacial phenomena in solids, point and extended defects in electronic materials, pressure-induced amorphization in silicates and disordered systems, clusters and confined systems, and the diffusion and microstructure of liquids.

His current research interests include quantum models for functionalized nanostructures, simulated images from probe microscopies, materials informatics applied to the prediction of novel magnetic materials and high performance algorithms for solving the electronic structure problem.

He has published over 450 papers, including five monographs, and has an h-index of 91.

He earned his BS degree, Summa Cum Laude, in physics from Kansas State University in 1970, a PhD in physics from the University of California at Berkeley in 1975. He performed postdoctoral work at Bell Laboratories from 1976–1978 and was an assistant professor at the University of Oregon from 1978–1980. From 1980–1987 he worked at Exxon Research and Engineering Corporate Research Science Laboratories, where he served as group head in theoretical physics and chemistry. In 1987 Chelikowsky became a professor at the University of Minnesota within the department of chemical engineering and materials science. He was named an Institute of Technology Distinguished Professor at Minnesota in 2001. He assumed his current position as the W.A. "Tex" Moncrief Jr. Chair of Computational Materials and professor in the Departments of Physics, Chemical Engineering, and Chemistry and Biochemistry in January 2005.

He is also a fellow of the American Association for the Advancement of Science, the American Physical Society and the Materials Research Society. He was also named an outstanding referee for the American Physical Society, a lifetime award.

== Honors and awards ==
- John Simon Guggenheim Fellowship (1995)
- David Turnbull Lectureship Award from the Materials Research Society (2001)
- David Adler Lectureship Award from the American Physical Society (2006)
- Aneesur Rahman Prize for Computational Physics from the American Physical Society (2013)
- FMD John Bardeen Award from The Minerals, Metals, and Materials Society (2021)
- The Foresight Institute Feynman Prize for Theory (2022)
- The Hill Prize in Physical Sciences (2025)

== Bibliography ==
- Electronic Structure and optical Properties of Semiconductors, with Marvin L. Cohen, Springer, 2012
- Electronic Materials: A New Era in Materials Science, with Alfonso Franciosi, Springer, 2011
- Introduction to the Quantum Theory of Atoms Molecules and Clusters, John Wiley & Sons, Inc., 2019
- The Optical Properties of Materials: Volume 579 (MRS Proceedings), with Eric L. Shirley, Steven G. Louie and Gerard Martinez, 2000
- Quantum Theory of Real Materials, with Steven G. Louie, Springer, 1996
- The Foresight Institute Feynman Prize for Theory (2022)
