= Jürgen Gauß =

German theoretical chemist (born 1960)

- Born: 13 August 1960 (age 66); Konstanz
- Education: University of Florida; University of Cologne
- Scientific career
- Fields: Chemistry

Jürgen Gauß (Juergen Gauss) is a German theoretical chemist.

Gauß was born on 13 August 1960 in Konstanz. He studied chemistry at the University of Cologne from 1979 till 1984. After finishing his PhD thesis on abinitio calculations at the University of Cologne in 1988, he did postdoctoral studies at the University of Washington in Seattle and at the University of Florida in Gainesville about quantum theory. He did his habilitation in 1994 at the University of Karlsruhe on abinitio calculations of NMR-shifts. In 1995, he became professor at the University of Mainz.

In 2005, he received the Gottfried Wilhelm Leibniz Prize of the Deutsche Forschungsgemeinschaft, which is the highest honour awarded in German research.
