= Trygve Helgaker =

Norwegian theoretical chemist and professor

Trygve Helgaker (born August 11, 1953, in Porsgrunn, Norway) is professor of chemistry, Department of Chemistry, University of Oslo, Norway.

He was inducted into the Norwegian Academy of Science and Letters in 2004 and the International Academy of Quantum Molecular Science in 2005.

He has written more than 200 scientific papers, and the book, Molecular Electronic-Structure Theory (Trygve Helgaker, Poul Jørgensen, and Jeppe Olsen, Wiley, Chichester, 2000). He is one of the main authors of the DALTON program.
