= Heavy baryon chiral perturbation theory =

Effective theory for baryons

Heavy baryon chiral perturbation theory (HBChPT) is an effective quantum field theory used to describe the interactions of pions, nucleons and baryons. It is an extension of chiral perturbation theory (ChPT), which describes the low-energy interactions of pions. A fully relativistic Lagrangian of nucleons is non-predictive as the quantum corrections, or loop diagrams can count as $\mathcal{O}(1)$ quantities and therefore do not describe higher-order corrections.

Because the baryons are much heavier than the pions, HBChPT rests on the use of a nonrelativistic description of baryons compared to that of the pions. Therefore, higher order terms in the HBChPT Lagrangian scale as $m_B^{-n}$, where $m_B$ is the baryon mass.

== See also ==
- Hyperon
- Infrared dimensional regularization
