= Skyrmion =

Type of topological solutions in non-linear sigma models

In particle theory, the skyrmion (/ˈskɜːrmi.ɒn/) is a topologically stable field configuration of a certain class of non-linear sigma models. The term was first used in 1979 to name a model of the nucleon proposed in 1961 by Tony Skyrme. As a topological soliton in the pion field, it has the remarkable property of being able to model, with reasonable accuracy, multiple low-energy properties of the nucleon, simply by fixing the nucleon radius. It has since found application in solid-state physics, as well as having ties to certain areas of string theory.

Skyrmions as topological objects are important in solid-state physics, especially in the emerging technology of spintronics. A two-dimensional magnetic skyrmion, as a topological object, is formed, e.g., from a 3D effective-spin "hedgehog" (in the field of micromagnetics: out of a so-called "Bloch point" singularity of homotopy degree +1) by a stereographic projection, whereby the positive north-pole spin is mapped onto a far-off edge circle of a 2D-disk, while the negative south-pole spin is mapped onto the center of the disk. In a spinor field such as for example photonic or polariton fluids the skyrmion topology corresponds to a full Poincaré beam (a spin vortex comprising all the states of polarization mapped by a stereographic projection of the Poincaré sphere to the real plane). A dynamical pseudospin skyrmion results from the stereographic projection of a rotating polariton Bloch sphere in the case of dynamical full Bloch beams.

Skyrmions have been reported, but not conclusively proven, to appear in Bose–Einstein condensates, thin magnetic films, and chiral nematic liquid crystals, as well as in free-space optics.

As a model of the nucleon, the topological stability of the skyrmion can be interpreted as a statement that the baryon number is conserved; i.e. that the proton does not decay. The Skyrme Lagrangian is essentially a one-parameter model of the nucleon. Fixing the parameter fixes the proton radius, and also fixes all other low-energy properties, which appear to be correct to about 30%, a significant level of predictive power.

Hollowed-out skyrmions form the basis for the chiral bag model (Cheshire Cat model) of the nucleon. The exact results for the duality between the fermion spectrum and the topological winding number of the non-linear sigma model have been obtained by Dan Freed. This can be interpreted as a foundation for the duality between a quantum chromodynamics (QCD) description of the nucleon (but consisting only of quarks, and without gluons) and the Skyrme model for the nucleon.

The skyrmion can be quantized to form a quantum superposition of baryons and resonance states. It could be predicted from some nuclear matter properties.

== Topological soliton ==
In field theory, skyrmions are homotopically non-trivial classical solutions of a nonlinear sigma model with a non-trivial target manifold topology – hence, they are topological solitons. An example occurs in chiral models of mesons, where the target manifold is a homogeneous space of the structure group

$$\left(\frac{\operatorname{SU}(N)_L \times \operatorname{SU}(N)_R}{\operatorname{SU}(N)_\text{diag}}\right),$$

where SU(N)_{L} and SU(N)_{R} are the left and right chiral symmetries, and SU(N)_{diag} is the diagonal subgroup. In nuclear physics, for N = 2, the chiral symmetries are understood to be the isospin symmetry of the nucleon. For N = 3, the isoflavor symmetry between the up, down and strange quarks is more broken, and the skyrmion models are less successful or accurate.

If spacetime has the topology S^{3}×R, then classical configurations can be classified by an integral winding number because the third homotopy group

$$\pi_3\left(\frac{\operatorname{SU}(N)_L \times \operatorname{SU}(N)_R}{\operatorname{SU}(N)_\text{diag}} \cong \operatorname{SU}(N)\right)$$

is equivalent to the ring of integers, with the congruence sign referring to homeomorphism.

A topological term can be added to the chiral Lagrangian, whose integral depends only upon the homotopy class; this results in superselection sectors in the quantized model. In (1 + 1)-dimensional spacetime, a skyrmion can be approximated by a soliton of the Sine–Gordon equation; after quantization by the Bethe ansatz or otherwise, it turns into a fermion interacting according to the massive Thirring model.

== Lagrangian ==
The Lagrangian for the skyrmion, as written for the original chiral SU(2) effective Lagrangian of the nucleon-nucleon interaction (in (3 + 1)-dimensional spacetime), can be written as

$$\mathcal{L} =
\frac{-f^2_\pi}{4}\operatorname{tr}(L_\mu L^\mu) + \frac{1}{32g^2} \operatorname{tr}[L_\mu, L_\nu] [L^\mu, L^\nu],$$

where $L_\mu = U^\dagger \partial_\mu U$, $U = \exp i\vec\tau \cdot \vec\theta$, $\vec\tau$ are the isospin Pauli matrices, $[\cdot, \cdot]$ is the Lie bracket commutator, and tr is the matrix trace. The meson field (pion field, up to a dimensional factor) at spacetime coordinate $x$ is given by $\vec\theta = \vec\theta(x)$. A broad review of the geometric interpretation of $L_\mu$ is presented in the article on sigma models.

When written this way, the $U$ is clearly an element of the Lie group SU(2), and $\vec\theta$ an element of the Lie algebra su(2). The pion field can be understood abstractly to be a section of the tangent bundle of the principal fiber bundle of SU(2) over spacetime. This abstract interpretation is characteristic of all non-linear sigma models.

The first term, $\operatorname{tr}(L_\mu L^\mu)$ is just an unusual way of writing the quadratic term of the non-linear sigma model; it reduces to $-\operatorname{tr}(\partial_\mu U^\dagger \partial^\mu U)$. When used as a model of the nucleon, one writes

$$U = \frac{1}{f_\pi}(\sigma + i\vec\tau \cdot \vec\pi),$$

with the dimensional factor of $f_\pi$ being the pion decay constant. (In 1 + 1 dimensions, this constant is not dimensional and can thus be absorbed into the field definition.)

The second term establishes the characteristic size of the lowest-energy soliton solution; it determines the effective radius of the soliton. As a model of the nucleon, it is normally adjusted so as to give the correct radius for the proton; once this is done, other low-energy properties of the nucleon are automatically fixed, to within about 30% accuracy. It is this result, of tying together what would otherwise be independent parameters, and doing so fairly accurately, that makes the Skyrme model of the nucleon so appealing and interesting. Thus, for example, constant $g$ in the quartic term is interpreted as the vector-pion coupling ρ–π–π between the rho meson (the nuclear vector meson) and the pion; the skyrmion relates the value of this constant to the baryon radius.

== Topological charge or winding number ==
The local winding number density (or topological charge density) is given by

$$\mathcal{B}^\mu = \epsilon^{\mu\nu\alpha\beta} \operatorname{Tr} \{ L_\nu L_\alpha L_\beta \},$$

where $\epsilon^{\mu\nu\alpha\beta}$ is the totally antisymmetric Levi-Civita symbol (equivalently, the Hodge star, in this context).

As a physical quantity, this can be interpreted as the baryon current; it is conserved: $\partial_\mu \mathcal{B}^\mu = 0$, and the conservation follows as a Noether current for the chiral symmetry.

The corresponding charge is the baryon number:

$$B = \int d^3x\, \mathcal{B}^0(x).$$

Which is conserved due to topological reasons and it is always an integer. For this reason, it is associated with the baryon number of the nucleus. As a conserved charge, it is time-independent: $dB/dt = 0$, the physical interpretation of which is that protons do not decay.

In the chiral bag model, one cuts a hole out of the center and fills it with quarks. Despite this obvious "hackery", the total baryon number is conserved: the missing charge from the hole is exactly compensated by the spectral asymmetry of the vacuum fermions inside the bag.

== Magnetic materials/data storage ==
One particular form of skyrmions is magnetic skyrmions, found in magnetic materials that exhibit spiral magnetism due to the Dzyaloshinskii–Moriya interaction, double-exchange mechanism or competing Heisenberg exchange interactions. They form "domains" as small as 1 nm (e.g. in Fe on Ir(111)). The small size and low energy consumption of magnetic skyrmions make them a good candidate for future data-storage solutions and other spintronics devices. Researchers could read and write skyrmions using scanning tunneling microscopy. The topological charge, representing the existence and non-existence of skyrmions, can represent the bit states "1" and "0". Room-temperature skyrmions were reported.

Skyrmions operate at current densities that are several orders of magnitude weaker than conventional magnetic devices. In 2015 a practical way to create and access magnetic skyrmions under ambient room-temperature conditions was announced. The device used arrays of magnetized cobalt disks as artificial Bloch skyrmion lattices atop a thin film of cobalt and palladium. Asymmetric magnetic nanodots were patterned with controlled circularity on an underlayer with perpendicular magnetic anisotropy (PMA). Polarity is controlled by a tailored magnetic-field sequence and demonstrated in magnetometry measurements. The vortex structure is imprinted into the underlayer's interfacial region by suppressing the PMA by a critical ion-irradiation step. The lattices are identified with polarized neutron reflectometry and have been confirmed by magnetoresistance measurements.

A recent (2019) study demonstrated a way to move skyrmions, purely using electric field (in the absence of electric current). The authors used Co/Ni multilayers with a thickness slope and Dzyaloshinskii–Moriya interaction and demonstrated skyrmions. They showed that the displacement and velocity depended directly on the applied voltage.

In 2020, a team of researchers from the Swiss Federal Laboratories for Materials Science and Technology (Empa) has succeeded for the first time in producing a tunable multilayer system in which two different types of skyrmions – the future bits for "0" and "1" – can exist at room temperature.

== See also ==
- Hopfion, 3D counterpart of skyrmions
