= Non-linear sigma model =

Class of quantum field theory models

In quantum field theory, a nonlinear σ model describes a field Σ that takes on values in a nonlinear manifold called the target manifold T. The non-linear σ-model was introduced by Gell-Mann & Lévy (1960, §6), who named it after a field corresponding to a sp meson called σ in their model. This article deals primarily with the quantization of the non-linear sigma model; please refer to the base article on the sigma model for general definitions and classical (non-quantum) formulations and results.

== Description ==
The target manifold T is equipped with a Riemannian metric g. Σ is a differentiable map from Minkowski space M (or some other space) to T.

The Lagrangian density in contemporary chiral form is given by

$$\mathcal{L}={1\over 2}g(\partial^\mu\Sigma,\partial_\mu\Sigma)-V(\Sigma)$$

where we have used a + − − − metric signature and the partial derivative ∂Σ is given by a section of the jet bundle of T×M and V is the potential.

In the coordinate notation, with the coordinates Σ^{a}, a = 1, ..., n where n is the dimension of T,

$$\mathcal{L}={1\over 2}g_{ab}(\Sigma) (\partial^\mu \Sigma^a) (\partial_\mu \Sigma^b) - V(\Sigma).$$

In more than two dimensions, nonlinear σ models contain a dimensionful coupling constant and are thus not perturbatively renormalizable. Nevertheless, they exhibit a non-trivial ultraviolet fixed point of the renormalization group both in the lattice formulation and in the double expansion originally proposed by Kenneth G. Wilson.

In both approaches, the non-trivial renormalization-group fixed point found for the O(n)-symmetric model is seen to simply describe, in dimensions greater than two, the critical point separating the ordered from the disordered phase. In addition, the improved lattice or quantum field theory predictions can then be compared to laboratory experiments on critical phenomena, since the O(n) model describes physical Heisenberg ferromagnets and related systems. The above results point therefore to a failure of naive perturbation theory in describing correctly the physical behavior of the O(n)-symmetric model above two dimensions, and to the need for more sophisticated non-perturbative methods such as the lattice formulation.

This means they can only arise as effective field theories. New physics is needed at around the distance scale where the two point connected correlation function is of the same order as the curvature of the target manifold. This is called the UV completion of the theory. There is a special class of nonlinear σ models with the internal symmetry group G *. If G is a Lie group and H is a Lie subgroup, then the quotient space G/H is a manifold (subject to certain technical restrictions like H being a closed subset) and is also a homogeneous space of G or in other words, a nonlinear realization of G. In many cases, G/H can be equipped with a Riemannian metric which is G-invariant. This is always the case, for example, if G is compact. A nonlinear σ model with G/H as the target manifold with a G-invariant Riemannian metric and a zero potential is called a quotient space (or coset space) nonlinear σ model.

When computing path integrals, the functional measure needs to be "weighted" by the square root of the determinant of g,

$$\sqrt{\det g}\mathcal{D}\Sigma.$$

== Renormalization ==
This model proved to be relevant in string theory where the two-dimensional manifold is named worldsheet. Appreciation of its generalized renormalizability was provided by Daniel Friedan. He showed that the theory admits a renormalization group equation, at the leading order of perturbation theory, in the form

$$\lambda\frac{\partial g_{ab}}{\partial\lambda}=\beta_{ab}(T^{-1}g)=R_{ab}+O(T^2)~,$$

R_{ab} being the Ricci tensor of the target manifold.

This represents a Ricci flow, obeying Einstein field equations for the target manifold as a fixed point. The existence of such a fixed point is relevant, as it grants, at this order of perturbation theory, that conformal invariance is not lost due to quantum corrections, so that the quantum field theory of this model is sensible (renormalizable).

Further adding nonlinear interactions representing flavor-chiral anomalies results in the Wess–Zumino–Witten model, which augments the geometry of the flow to include torsion, preserving renormalizability and leading to an infrared fixed point as well, on account of teleparallelism ("geometrostasis").

== O(3) non-linear sigma model ==
A celebrated example, of particular interest due to its topological properties, is the O(3) nonlinear σ-model in 1 + 1 dimensions, with the Lagrangian density

$$\mathcal L= \tfrac{1}{2}\ \partial^\mu \hat n \cdot\partial_\mu \hat n$$

where n̂=(n_{1}, n_{2}, n_{3}) with the constraint n̂⋅n̂=1 and μ=1,2.

This model allows for topological finite action solutions, as at infinite space-time the Lagrangian density must vanish, meaning n̂ = constant at infinity. Therefore, in the class of finite-action solutions, one may identify the points at infinity as a single point, i.e. that space-time can be identified with a Riemann sphere.

Since the n̂-field lives on a sphere as well, the mapping S^{2}→ S^{2} is in evidence, the solutions of which are classified by the second homotopy group of a 2-sphere: These solutions are called the O(3) Instantons.

This model can also be considered in 1+2 dimensions, where the topology now comes only from the spatial slices. These are modelled as R^2 with a point at infinity, and hence have the same topology as the O(3) instantons in 1+1 dimensions. They are called sigma model lumps.

== See also ==
- Sigma model
- Chiral model
- Little Higgs
- Skyrmion, a soliton in non-linear sigma models
- Polyakov action
- WZW model
- Fubini–Study metric, a metric often used with non-linear sigma models
- Ricci flow
- Scale invariance
