= Brown–Rho scaling =

Approximate scaling law for hadrons in extreme environments

In quantum chromodynamics (QCD), Brown–Rho (BR) scaling is an approximate scaling law for hadrons in an ultra-hot, ultra-dense medium, such as hadrons in the quark epoch during the first microsecond of the Big Bang or within neutron stars.

According to Gerald E. Brown and Mannque Rho in their 1991 publication in Physical Review Letters:

By using effective chiral Lagrangians with a suitable incorporation of the scaling property of QCD, we establish the approximate in-medium scaling law, m^{*}_{σ}/m_{σ} ≈ m^{*}_{N}/m_{N} ≈ m^{*}_{ρ}/m_{ρ} ≈ m^{*}_{ω}/m_{ω} ≈ f^{*}_{π}/f_{π}. This has a highly nontrivial implication for nuclear processes at or above nuclear-matter density.

m_{ρ} refers to the pole mass of the ρ meson, whereas m^{*}_{ρ} refers to the in-medium mass (or running mass in the medium) of the ρ meson according to QCD sum rules. The omega meson, sigma meson, and neutron are denoted by ω, σ, and N, respectively. The symbol f_{π} denotes the free-space pion decay constant. (Decay constants have a "running time" and a "pole time" similar to the "running mass" and "pole mass" concepts, according to special relativity.) The symbol F_{π} is also used to denote the pion decay constant.

For hadrons, a large part of their masses are generated by the chiral condensate. Since the chiral condensate may vary significantly in hot and/or dense matter, hadron masses would also be modified. ... Brown–Rho scaling ... suggests that the partial restoration of the chiral symmetry can be experimentally accessible by measuring in-medium hadron masses, and triggered many later theoretical and experimental works. Theoretically, a similar behavior is also found in the NJL model ... and the QCD sum rule ...

The hypothesis of Brown–Rho scaling is supported by experimental evidence on beta decay of ^{14}C to the ^{14}N ground state.

== See also ==
- Quantum chromodynamics
- QCD matter
- Pion decay constant
