= Folk theorem (physics) =

Conjecture in theoretical physics

In theoretical physics, the folk theorem states how to construct an effective field theory. It was first formulated by Steven Weinberg in the 1979 in the context of quantum chromodynamics and the origin of nuclear forces. It is a "folk theorem" in the sense that is a motivated conjecture, with no rigorous proof, but expected to be valid. It states that the most general Lagrangian that is consistent with the symmetries of the underlying theory can be rendered into an effective field theory at low energies that respects the symmetries and is well-behaved.

The theorem has been credited for motivating the development of the chiral perturbation theory in the 1980s. It was first used to calculate processes involving soft pions (low energy pions).

== Description ==
The folk theorem states that the most general Lagrangian that respect the desired symmetries is the simplest way to implement S-matrix theory, and its low energy limit leads to an effective field theory. As originally stated, Weinberg says:

This remark is based on a "theorem", which as far as I know has never been proven, but which I cannot imagine could be wrong. The "theorem" says that although individual quantum field theories have of course a good deal of content, quantum field theory itself has no content beyond analyticity, unitarity, cluster decomposition, and symmetry. This can be put more precisely in the context of perturbation theory: If one writes down the most general possible Lagrangian, including all terms consistent with assumed symmetry principles, and then calculates matrix elements with this Lagrangian to any given order of perturbation theory, the result will simply be the most general possible S-matrix consistent with perturbative unitarity analyticity, cluster decomposition, and the assumed symmetry properties.

— Steven Weinberg, "Phenomenological Lagrangians" (1979),

The folk theorem suggest a procedure to obtain an effective field theory:

1. Recognize the low- and high-energy scales of the theory.
2. Determine the symmetries of the low energy theory.
3. Write down the most general Lagrangian that respect the symmetry breaking.
4. Use perturbation theory and Feynman diagrams to obtain results up to the desired order.

The resulting effective field theory should recover the symmetries of the interaction, unitarity of the S-matrix, analyticity and cluster decomposition.

The theorem is expected to apply to quantum gravity and to an hypothetical theory of everything.
