= Third Thoughts =

2018 book by Steven Weinberg

- First edition
- Author: Steven Weinberg
- Language: English
- Publisher: Belknap Press of Harvard University Press
- Publication date: 2018
- Publication place: USA
- Pages: 240
- ISBN: 978-0-674-97532-3
- OCLC: 1019833836

Third Thoughts is a 2018 book of 25 essays written by Steven Weinberg, mostly in the decade preceding 2018. Most of the essays were previously published in The New York Review of Books, newspapers, and other periodicals. Essays numbered 20, 23, 24, and 25 are published for the first time in the book. Essay number 6 is the foreword to the 2014 book Time in Powers of Ten. There are 8 essays in the section on science history, 6 essays in the section on physics and cosmology, 6 essays in the section on public matters, and 5 essays in the section on personal matters.

== Essays ==
I. SCIENCE HISTORY

- 1 The Uses of Astronomy (pp. 3-14); 2009
- 2 The Art of Discovery (pp. 15-21)
- 3 From Rutherford to the LHC (pp. 22-35); 2011
- 4 Educators and Academics, Underground in Texas (pp. 36-38)
- 5 The Rise of the Standard Models (pp. 39-51); 2013
- 6 Long Times and Short Times (pp. 52-54)
- 7 Keeping an Eye on the Present—Whig History of Science (pp. 55-66); 2015
- 8 The Whig History of Science: An Exchange (pp. 67-70); 2016

II. PHYSICS AND COSMOLOGY

- 9 What Is an Elementary Particle? (pp. 73-82); 1996
- 10 The Universe We Still Don’t Know (pp. 83-95); 2011
- 11 Varieties of Symmetry (pp. 96-111); 2011
- 12 The Higgs, and Beyond (pp. 112-118); 2011
- 13 Why the Higgs? (pp. 119-123); 2012
- 14 The Trouble with Quantum Mechanics (pp. 124-142); 2017

III. PUBLIC MATTERS

- 15 Obama Gets Space Funding Right (pp. 145-148)
- 16 The Crisis of Big Science (pp. 149-163); 2012
- 17 Liberal Disappointment (pp. 164-166); 2012
- 18 Keep Loopholes Open (pp. 167-170)
- 19 Against Manned Space Flight (pp. 171-175)
- 20 Skeptics and Scientists (pp. 176-182)

IV. PERSONAL MATTERS

- 21 Change Course (pp. 183-184)
- 22 Writing about Science (pp. 185-191)
- 23 On Being Wrong (pp. 192-193)
- 24 The Craft of Science, and the Craft of Art (pp. 194-210)
- 25 New York to Austin, and Return (pp. 211-214)

== Reception ==
According to Robert P. Crease:

This essay collection (his third for a lay readership, hence the title), ranges widely over science, the history of science and current affairs, taking on everything from dark energy and quantum field theory to socio-economic inequity and the wastefulness of crewed space missions. ... Among half a dozen pieces on particle physics are lucid explications of, for instance, the Higgs boson, Hilbert space and the Large Hadron Collider. Weinberg has a knack for capturing a complex concept in a succinct, unforgettable image. ... A few of the essays delve into history. Weinberg has irked professionals in the field by venturing into their territory, but not because he gets his facts wrong. As a self-confessed ‘Whig’ historian, he believes that the past should be judged by values of the present ... Weinberg is at his most interesting when probing the big uncertainties in physics. ...

According to Mario Livio:

... This book should be read not only for its insightful and illuminating explanations of a wide range of physical phenomena but also for the opportunity it affords to follow the wanderings of a brilliant mind through topics ranging from high-energy physics and the makeup of the cosmos to poetry, and from the history and philosophy of science to the dangers of economic inequality. ... The final section of the book, “Personal matters,” includes such topics as science writing, the importance of being (occasionally) wrong, and the similarities and differences between the craft of science and the craft of art.
