= Sigma model =

Field theory of a point particle confined to move on a fixed manifold

In physics, a sigma model is a field theory that describes the field as a point particle confined to move on a fixed manifold. This manifold can be taken to be any Riemannian manifold, although it is most commonly taken to be either a Lie group or a symmetric space. The model may or may not be quantized. An example of the non-quantized version is the Skyrme model; it cannot be quantized due to non-linearities of power greater than 4. In general, sigma models admit (classical) topological soliton solutions, for example, the skyrmion for the Skyrme model. When the sigma field is coupled to a gauge field, the resulting model is described by Ginzburg–Landau theory. This article is primarily devoted to the classical field theory of the sigma model; the corresponding quantized theory is presented in the article titled "non-linear sigma model".

== Overview ==
The name has roots in particle physics, where a sigma model describes the interactions of pions. Unfortunately, the "sigma meson" is not described by the sigma-model, but only a component of it.

The sigma model was introduced by Gell-Mann & Lévy (1960, section 5); the name σ-model comes from a field in their model corresponding to a spinless meson called σ, a scalar meson introduced earlier by Julian Schwinger. The σ-meson was eventually discovered and identified to the$f_0(500)$ meson. The model served as the dominant prototype of spontaneous symmetry breaking of O(4) down to O(3): the three axial generators broken are the simplest manifestation of chiral symmetry breaking, the surviving unbroken O(3) representing isospin.

In conventional particle physics settings, the field is generally taken to be SU(N), or the vector subspace of quotient $(SU(N)_L\times SU(N)_R)/SU(N)$ of the product of left and right chiral fields. In condensed matter theories, the field is taken to be O(N). For the rotation group O(3), the sigma model describes the isotropic ferromagnet; more generally, the O(N) model shows up in the quantum Hall effect, superfluid Helium-3 and spin chains.

In supergravity models, the field is taken to be a symmetric space. Since symmetric spaces are defined in terms of their involution, their tangent space naturally splits into even and odd parity subspaces. This splitting helps propel the dimensional reduction of Kaluza–Klein theories.

In its most basic form, the sigma model can be taken as being purely the kinetic energy of a point particle; as a field, this is just the Dirichlet energy in Euclidean space.

In two spatial dimensions, the O(3) model is completely integrable.

== Definition ==
The Lagrangian density of the sigma model can be written in a variety of different ways, each suitable to a particular type of application. The simplest, most generic definition writes the Lagrangian as the metric trace of the pullback of the metric tensor on a Riemannian manifold. For $\phi:M\to\Phi$ a field over a spacetime $M$, this may be written as

$$\mathcal{L} = \frac{1}{2}\sum_{i=1}^n \sum_{j=1}^n g_{ij}(\phi) \; \partial^\mu\phi_i \partial_\mu\phi_j$$

where the $g_{ij}(\phi)$ is the metric tensor on the field space $\phi\in\Phi$, and the $\partial_\mu$ are the derivatives on the underlying spacetime manifold.

This expression can be unpacked a bit. The field space $\Phi$ can be chosen to be any Riemannian manifold. Historically, this is the "sigma" of the sigma model; the historically-appropriate symbol $\sigma$ is avoided here to prevent clashes with many other common usages of $\sigma$ in geometry. Riemannian manifolds always come with a metric tensor $g$. Given an atlas of charts on $\Phi$, the field space can always be locally trivialized, in that given $U\subset\Phi$ in the atlas, one may write a map $U\to\mathbb{R}^n$ giving explicit local coordinates $\phi=(\phi^1, \cdots,\phi^n)$ on that patch. The metric tensor on that patch is a matrix having components $g_{ij}(\phi).$

The base manifold $M$ must be a differentiable manifold; by convention, it is either Minkowski space in particle physics applications, flat two-dimensional Euclidean space for condensed matter applications, or a Riemann surface, the worldsheet in string theory. The $\partial_\mu \phi = \partial\phi/\partial x^\mu$ is just the plain-old covariant derivative on the base spacetime manifold $M.$ When $M$ is flat, $\partial_\mu \phi = \nabla\phi$ is just the ordinary gradient of a scalar function (as $\phi$ is a scalar field, from the point of view of $M$ itself.) In more precise language, $\partial_\mu\phi$ is a section of the jet bundle of $M\times\Phi$.

=== Example: O(n) non-linear sigma model ===
Taking $g_{ij}=\delta_{ij}$ the Kronecker delta, i.e. the scalar dot product in Euclidean space, one gets the $O(n)$ non-linear sigma model. That is, write $\phi =\hat{u}$ to be the unit vector in $\mathbb{R}^{n}$, so that $\hat{u}\cdot\hat{u}=1$, with $\cdot$ the ordinary Euclidean dot product. Then $\hat{u}\in S^{n-1}$ the $(n-1)$-sphere, the isometries of which are the rotation group $O(n)$. The Lagrangian can then be written as

$$\mathcal{L} = \frac{1}{2} \nabla_\mu\hat{u} \cdot \nabla_\mu\hat{u}$$

For $n=3$, this is the continuum limit of the isotropic ferromagnet on a lattice, i.e. of the classical Heisenberg model. For $n=2$, this is the continuum limit of the classical XY model. See also the n-vector model and the Potts model for reviews of the lattice model equivalents. The continuum limit is taken by writing

$$\delta_h[\hat{u}](i,j)=\frac{\hat{u}_i - \hat{u}_j}{h}$$

as the finite difference on neighboring lattice locations $i,j.$ Then $\delta_h[\hat{u}]\to\partial_\mu\hat{u}$ in the limit $h\to 0$, and $\hat{u}_i\cdot \hat{u}_j\to \partial_\mu\hat{u} \cdot \partial_\mu\hat{u}$ after dropping the constant terms $\hat{u}_i\cdot\hat{u}_i=1$ (the "bulk magnetization").

== In geometric notation ==
The sigma model can also be written in a more fully geometric notation, as a fiber bundle with fibers $\Phi$ over a differentiable manifold $M$. Given a section $\phi:M\to\Phi$, fix a point $x\in M.$ The pushforward at $x$ is a map of tangent bundles

$\mathrm{d}_x\phi:T_xM\to T_{\phi(x)}\Phi\quad$ taking $\quad \partial_\mu \mapsto \frac{\partial \phi^i}{\partial x^\mu} \partial_i$

where $\partial_\mu=\partial/\partial x^\mu$ is taken to be a local orthonormal vector space basis on $TM$ and $\partial_i=\partial/\partial q^i$ the vector space basis on $T\Phi$. The $\mathrm{d}\phi$ is a differential form. The sigma model action is then just the conventional inner product on vector-valued k-forms

$$\mathcal{S} = \frac{1}{2} \int_M \mathrm{d}\phi \wedge {\star\mathrm{d}\phi}$$

where the $\wedge$ is the wedge product, and the $\star$ is the Hodge star. This is an inner product in two different ways. In the first way, given any two differentiable forms $\alpha,\beta$ in $M$, the Hodge dual defines an invariant inner product on the space of differential forms, commonly written as

$$\langle\!\langle\alpha,\beta\rangle\!\rangle \ =\  \int_M \alpha\wedge \star\beta$$

The above is an inner product on the space of square-integrable forms, conventionally taken to be the Sobolev space $L^2.$ In this way, one may write

$$\mathcal{S} = \frac{1}{2} \langle\!\langle \mathrm{d}\phi, \mathrm{d}\phi\rangle\!\rangle$$.

This makes it explicit and plainly evident that the sigma model is just the kinetic energy of a point particle. From the point of view of the manifold $M$, the field $\phi$ is a scalar, and so $\mathrm{d}\phi$ can be recognized just the ordinary gradient of a scalar function. The Hodge star is merely a fancy device for keeping track of the volume form when integrating on curved spacetime. In the case that $M$ is flat, it can be completely ignored, and so the action is

$$\mathcal{S} = \frac{1}{2} \int_M \Vert \nabla\phi\Vert^2 d^mx$$,

which is the Dirichlet energy of $\phi$. Classical extrema of the action (the solutions to the Lagrange equations) are then those field configurations that minimize the Dirichlet energy of $\phi$. Another way to convert this expression into a more easily-recognizable form is to observe that, for a scalar function $f:M\to\mathbb{R}$ one has $\mathrm{d} {\star}f=0$ and so one may also write

$$\mathcal{S} =  \frac{1}{2} \langle\!\langle \phi, \Delta\phi\rangle\!\rangle$$

where $\Delta$ is the Laplace–Beltrami operator, i.e., the ordinary Laplacian when $M$ is flat.

That there is another, second inner product in play simply requires not forgetting that $\mathrm{d}\phi$ is a vector from the point of view of $\Phi$ itself. That is, given any two vectors $v,w\in T\Phi$, the Riemannian metric $g_{ij}$ defines an inner product

$$\langle v,w\rangle = g_{ij}v^i w^j$$

Since $\mathrm{d}\phi$ is vector-valued $\mathrm{d}\phi = (\mathrm{d}\phi^1,\cdots, \mathrm{d}\phi^n)$ on local charts, one also takes the inner product there as well. More verbosely,

$$\mathcal{S} = \frac{1}{2}\int_M g_{ij}(\phi)\; \mathrm{d}\phi^i \wedge {\star\mathrm{d}\phi^j}$$.

The tension between these two inner products can be made even more explicit by noting that

$$B_{\mu\nu}(\phi)= g_{ij} \partial_\mu\phi^i \partial_\nu\phi^j$$

is a bilinear form; it is a pullback of the Riemann metric $g_{ij}$. The individual $\partial_\mu\phi^i$ can be taken as vielbeins. The Lagrangian density of the sigma model is then

$$\mathcal{L} = \frac{1}{2} g^{\mu\nu}B_{\mu\nu}$$

for $g_{\mu\nu}$ the metric on $M.$ Given this gluing-together, the $\mathrm{d}\phi$ can be interpreted as a solder form; this is articulated more fully below.

== Motivations and basic interpretations ==
Several interpretational and foundational remarks can be made about the classical (non-quantized) sigma model. The first of these is that the classical sigma model can be interpreted as a model of non-interacting quantum mechanics. The second concerns the interpretation of energy.

=== Interpretation as quantum mechanics ===
This follows directly from the expression

$$\mathcal{S} =  \frac{1}{2} \langle\!\langle \phi, \Delta\phi\rangle\!\rangle$$

given above. Taking $\Phi=\mathbb{C}$, the function $\phi:M\to\mathbb{C}$ can be interpreted as a wave function, and its Laplacian the kinetic energy of that wave function. The $\langle\!\langle \cdot, \cdot\rangle\!\rangle$ is just some geometric machinery reminding one to integrate over all space. The corresponding quantum mechanical notation is $\phi=|\psi\rangle.$ In flat space, the Laplacian is conventionally written as $\Delta=\nabla^2$. Assembling all these pieces together, the sigma model action is equivalent to

$$\mathcal{S} = \frac{1}{2} \int_M \langle \psi| \nabla^2 |\psi\rangle dx^m
= \frac{1}{2} \int_M \psi^\dagger(x) \nabla^2 \psi(x) dx^m$$

which is just the grand-total kinetic energy of the wave-function $\psi(x)$, up to a factor of $\hbar/m$. To conclude, the classical sigma model on $\mathbb{C}$ can be interpreted as the quantum mechanics of a free, non-interacting quantum particle. Obviously, adding a term of $V(\phi)$ to the Lagrangian results in the quantum mechanics of a wave-function in a potential. Taking $\Phi=\mathbb{C}^n$ is not enough to describe the $n$-particle system, in that $n$ particles require $n$ distinct coordinates, which are not provided by the base manifold. This can be solved by taking $n$ copies of the base manifold.

=== The solder form ===
It is very well-known that the geodesic structure of a Riemannian manifold is described by the Hamilton–Jacobi equations. In thumbnail form, the construction is as follows. Both $M$ and $\Phi$ are Riemannian manifolds; the below is written for $\Phi$, the same can be done for $M$. The cotangent bundle $T^*\Phi$, supplied with coordinate charts, can always be locally trivialized, i.e.

$$\left. T^*\Phi\right|_U \cong U \times \mathbb {R}^n$$

The trivialization supplies canonical coordinates $(q^1,\cdots,q^n,p_1,\cdots,p_n)$ on the cotangent bundle. Given the metric tensor $g_{ij}$ on $\Phi$, define the Hamiltonian function

$$H(q,p)=\frac{1}{2}g^{ij}(q)p_ip_j$$

where, as always, one is careful to note that the inverse of the metric is used in this definition: $g^{ij}g_{jk}=\delta^i_k.$ Famously, the geodesic flow on $\Phi$ is given by the Hamilton–Jacobi equations

$\dot{q}^i=\frac{\partial H}{\partial p_i}\quad$ and $\quad\dot{p}_i=-\frac{\partial H}{\partial q^i}$

The geodesic flow is the Hamiltonian flow; the solutions to the above are the geodesics of the manifold. Note, incidentally, that $dH/dt=0$ along geodesics; the time parameter $t$ is the distance along the geodesic.

The sigma model takes the momenta in the two manifolds $T^*\Phi$ and $T^*M$ and solders them together, in that $\mathrm{d}\phi$ is a solder form. In this sense, the interpretation of the sigma model as an energy functional is not surprising; it is in fact the gluing together of two energy functionals. Caution: the precise definition of a solder form requires it to be an isomorphism; this can only happen if $M$ and $\Phi$ have the same real dimension. Furthermore, the conventional definition of a solder form takes $\Phi$ to be a Lie group. Both conditions are satisfied in various applications.

== Results on various spaces ==
The space $\Phi$ is often taken to be a Lie group, usually SU(N), in the conventional particle physics models, O(N) in condensed matter theories, or as a symmetric space in supergravity models. Since symmetric spaces are defined in terms of their involution, their tangent space (i.e. the place where $\mathrm{d}\phi$ lives) naturally splits into even and odd parity subspaces. This splitting helps propel the dimensional reduction of Kaluza–Klein theories.

=== On Lie groups ===
For the special case of $\Phi$ being a Lie group, the $g_{ij}$ is the metric tensor on the Lie group, formally called the Cartan tensor or the Killing form. The Lagrangian can then be written as the pullback of the Killing form. Note that the Killing form can be written as a trace over two matrices from the corresponding Lie algebra; thus, the Lagrangian can also be written in a form involving the trace. With slight re-arrangements, it can also be written as the pullback of the Maurer–Cartan form.

=== On symmetric spaces ===
A common variation of the sigma model is to present it on a symmetric space. The prototypical example is the chiral model, which takes the product

$$G=SU(N)\times SU(N)$$

of the "left" and "right" chiral fields, and then constructs the sigma model on the "diagonal"

$$\Phi=\frac{SU(N)\times SU(N)}{SU(N)}$$

Such a quotient space is a symmetric space, and so one can generically take $\Phi=G/H$ where $H\subset G$ is the maximal subgroup of $G$ that is invariant under the Cartan involution. The Lagrangian is still written exactly as the above, either in terms of the pullback of the metric on $G$ to a metric on $G/H$ or as a pullback of the Maurer–Cartan form.

=== Trace notation ===
In physics, the most common and conventional statement of the sigma model begins with the definition

$$L_\mu=\pi_\mathfrak{m} \circ \left(g^{-1}\partial_\mu g \right)$$

Here, the $g^{-1}\partial_\mu g$ is the pullback of the Maurer–Cartan form, for $g\in G$, onto the spacetime manifold. The $\pi_\mathfrak{m}$ is a projection onto the odd-parity piece of the Cartan involution. That is, given the Lie algebra $\mathfrak{g}$ of $G$, the involution decomposes the space into odd and even parity components $\mathfrak{g}=\mathfrak{m}\oplus\mathfrak{h}$ corresponding to the two eigenstates of the involution. The sigma model Lagrangian can then be written as

$$\mathcal{L}=\frac{1}{2}\mathrm{tr}\left(L_\mu L^\mu\right)$$

This is instantly recognizable as the first term of the Skyrme model.

=== Metric form ===
The equivalent metric form of this is to write a group element $g\in G$ as the geodesic $g=\exp(\theta^i T_i)$ of an element $\theta^i T_i\in \mathfrak{g}$ of the Lie algebra $\mathfrak{g}$. The $[T_i,T_j]={f_{ij}}^k T_k$ are the basis elements for the Lie algebra; the ${f_{ij}}^k$ are the structure constants of $\mathfrak{g}$.

Plugging this directly into the above and applying the infinitesimal form of the Baker–Campbell–Hausdorff formula promptly leads to the equivalent expression

$$\mathcal{L} = \frac{1}{2} g_{ij}(\phi) \; \mathrm{d}\phi_i \wedge \star{\mathrm{d}\phi_j}
= \frac{1}{2} \; {W_i}^m {W^n}_j \;\; \mathrm{d}\phi_i \wedge\star{\mathrm{d}\phi_j} \;\;\mathrm{tr} (T_m T_n)$$

where $\mathrm{tr} (T_m T_n)$ is now obviously (proportional to) the Killing form, and the ${W_i}^m$ are the vielbeins that express the "curved" metric $g_{ij}$ in terms of the "flat" metric $\mathrm{tr} (T_m T_n)$. The article on the Baker–Campbell–Hausdorff formula provides an explicit expression for the vielbeins. They can be written as

$$W=\sum_{n=0}^\infty \frac{(-1)^nM^n}{(n+1)!} = (I-e^{-M})M^{-1}$$

where $M$ is a matrix whose matrix elements are ${M_j}^k = \theta^i{f_{ij}}^k$.

For the sigma model on a symmetric space, as opposed to a Lie group, the $T_i$ are limited to span the subspace $\mathfrak{m}$ instead of all of $\mathfrak{g}=\mathfrak{m}\oplus\mathfrak{h}$. The Lie commutator on $\mathfrak{m}$ will not be within $\mathfrak{m}$; indeed, one has $[ \mathfrak{m},\mathfrak{m}]\subset \mathfrak{h}$ and so a projection is still needed.

== Extensions ==
The model can be extended in a variety of ways. Besides the aforementioned Skyrme model, which introduces quartic terms, the model may be augmented by a torsion term to yield the Wess–Zumino–Witten model.

Another possibility is frequently seen in supergravity models. Here, one notes that the Maurer–Cartan form $g^{-1}dg$ looks like "pure gauge". In the construction above for symmetric spaces, one can also consider the other projection

$$A_\mu = \pi_\mathfrak{h}\circ\left(g^{-1}\partial_\mu g\right)$$

where, as before, the symmetric space corresponded to the split $\mathfrak{g}= \mathfrak{m}\oplus \mathfrak{h}$. This extra term can be interpreted as a connection on the fiber bundle $M\times H$ (it transforms as a gauge field). It is what is "left over" from the connection on $G$. It can be endowed with its own dynamics, by writing

$$\mathcal{L}=g_{ij}F^i\wedge{\star}F^j$$

with $F^i=dA^i$. Note that the differential here is just "d", and not a covariant derivative; this is not the Yang–Mills stress-energy tensor. This term is not gauge invariant by itself; it must be taken together with the part of the connection that embeds into $L_\mu$, so that taken together, the $L_\mu$, now with the connection as a part of it, together with this term, forms a complete gauge invariant Lagrangian (which does have the Yang–Mills terms in it, when expanded out).
