= Cosmology (book) =

Textbook by Steven Weinberg

- Author: Steven Weinberg
- Language: English
- Subjects: Modern Physics, Cosmology
- Publisher: Oxford University Press
- Publication place: United States
- English publication date: 2008 (1st edition); 2014 (reprint)
- Media type: Print
- Pages: 593
- ISBN: 978-0-19-852682-7
- OCLC: 182779803

Cosmology (2008) is a textbook about cosmology by American physicist Steven Weinberg. The textbook is intended for final-year physics undergraduates or first-year graduate students. The book is a successor to Weinberg's 1972 textbook Gravitation and Cosmology.

== Summary ==
Weinberg has cast his gaze over the vast terrain that cosmology has become since 1972, and his new work ranges from early-universe field and string theory, through inflation and phase transitions, Big Bang nucleosynthesis, and the decoupling of the microwave background radiation, and forward to the nonlinear era of the dissipative formation of galaxies and their large-scale clustering into an interconnected cosmic web.

== Chapters ==
- 1. The Expansion of the Universe
- 2. The Cosmic Microwave Radiation Background
- 3. The Early Universe
- 4. Inflation
- 5. General Theory of Cosmological Fluctuations
- 6. Evolution of Cosmological Fluctuations
- 7. Anisotropies in the Microwave Sky
- 8. The Growth of Structure
- 9. Gravitational Lensing
- 10. Fluctuations from Inflation
