= Chiral perturbation theory =

Effective field theory of quantum chromodynamics

Chiral perturbation theory (ChPT) is an effective field theory constructed with a Lagrangian consistent with the (approximate) chiral symmetry of quantum chromodynamics (QCD), as well as the other symmetries of parity and charge conjugation. ChPT is a theory which allows one to study the low-energy dynamics of QCD on the basis of this underlying chiral symmetry.

== Goals ==
In the theory of the strong interaction of the standard model, the interactions between quarks and gluons are described. Due to the running of the strong coupling constant, we can apply perturbation theory in the coupling constant only at high energies. But in the low-energy regime of QCD, the degrees of freedom are no longer quarks and gluons, but rather hadrons. This is a result of confinement. If one could "solve" the QCD partition function (such that the degrees of freedom in the Lagrangian are replaced by hadrons), then one could extract information about low-energy physics. To date this has not been accomplished. Because QCD becomes non-perturbative at low energy, it is impossible to use perturbative methods to extract information from the partition function of QCD. Lattice QCD is an alternative method that has proved successful in extracting non-perturbative information.

== Method ==
Using different degrees of freedom, we have to assure that observables calculated in the EFT are related to those of the underlying theory. According to Steven Weinberg's "folk theorem" it is achieved by using the most general Lagrangian that is consistent with the symmetries of the underlying theory, as this yields the ‘‘most general possible S-matrix consistent with analyticity, perturbative unitarity, cluster decomposition and the assumed symmetry. In general there is an infinite number of terms which meet this requirement. Therefore in order to make any physical predictions, one assigns to the theory a power-ordering scheme which organizes terms by some pre-determined degree of importance. The ordering allows one to keep some terms and omit all other, higher-order corrections which can safely be temporarily ignored.

There are several power counting schemes in ChPT. The most widely used one is the $p$-expansion where $p$ stands for momentum. However, there also exist the $\epsilon$, $\delta,$ and $\epsilon^{\prime}$ expansions. All of these expansions are valid in finite volume, (though the $p$ expansion is the only one valid in infinite volume.) Particular choices of finite volumes require one to use different reorganizations of the chiral theory in order to correctly understand the physics. These different reorganizations correspond to the different power counting schemes.

In addition to the ordering scheme, most terms in the approximate Lagrangian will be multiplied by coupling constants which represent the relative strengths of the force represented by each term. Values of these constants – also called low-energy constants or Ls – are usually not known. The constants can be determined by fitting to experimental data or be derived from underlying theory.

=== The model Lagrangian ===
The Lagrangian of the $p$-expansion is constructed by writing down all interactions which are not excluded by symmetry, and then ordering them based on the number of momentum and mass powers.

The order is chosen so that $(\partial \pi)^2 + m_{\pi}^2 \pi^2$ is considered in the first-order approximation, where $\pi$ is the pion field and $m_{\pi}$ the pion mass, which breaks the underlying chiral symmetry explicitly (PCAC). Terms like $m_{\pi}^4 \pi^2 + (\partial \pi)^6$ are part of other, higher order corrections.

It is also customary to compress the Lagrangian by replacing the single pion fields in each term with an infinite series of all possible combinations of pion fields. One of the most common choices is

$$U = \exp\left\{\frac{i}{F}  \begin{pmatrix} \pi^0  &  \sqrt{2}\pi^+ \\ \sqrt{2}\pi^- & - \pi^0 \end{pmatrix}\right\}$$

where $F$ is called the pion decay constant which is 93 MeV.

In general, different choices of the normalization for $F$ exist, so that one must choose the value that is consistent with the charged pion decay rate.

=== Renormalization ===
The effective theory in general is non-renormalizable, however given a particular power counting scheme in ChPT, the effective theory is renormalizable at a given order in the chiral expansion. For example, if one wishes to compute an observable to $\mathcal{O}(p^4)$, then one must compute the contact terms that come from the $\mathcal{O}(p^4)$ Lagrangian (this is different for an SU(2) vs. SU(3) theory) at tree-level and the one-loop contributions from the $\mathcal{O}(p^2)$ Lagrangian.)

One can easily see that a one-loop contribution from the $\mathcal{O}(p^2)$ Lagrangian counts as $\mathcal{O}(p^4)$ by noting that the integration measure counts as $p^4$, the propagator counts as $p^{-2}$, while the derivative contributions count as $p^2$. Therefore, since the calculation is valid to $\mathcal{O}(p^4)$, one removes the divergences in the calculation with the renormalization of the low-energy constants (LECs) from the $\mathcal{O}(p^4)$ Lagrangian. So if one wishes to remove all the divergences in the computation of a given observable to $\mathcal{O}(p^n)$, one uses the coupling constants in the expression for the $\mathcal{O}(p^n)$ Lagrangian to remove those divergences.

== Successful application ==
=== Mesons and nucleons ===
The theory allows the description of interactions between pions, and between pions and nucleons (or other matter fields). SU(3) ChPT can also describe interactions of kaons and eta mesons, while similar theories can be used to describe the vector mesons. Since chiral perturbation theory assumes chiral symmetry, and therefore massless quarks, it cannot be used to model interactions of the heavier quarks.

For an SU(2) theory the leading order chiral Lagrangian is given by

$$\mathcal{L}_{2}=\frac{F^2}{4}{\rm tr}(\partial_{\mu}U \partial^{\mu}U^{\dagger})+\frac{\lambda F^3}{4}{\rm tr}(m_q U+m_q^{\dagger}U^{\dagger})$$

where $F = 93$ MeV and $m_q$ is the quark mass matrix. In the $p$-expansion of ChPT, the small expansion parameters are

$$\frac{p}{\Lambda_{\chi}}, \frac{m_{\pi}}{\Lambda_{\chi}}.$$

where $\Lambda_{\chi}$ is the chiral symmetry breaking scale, of order 1 GeV (sometimes estimated as $\Lambda_{\chi} = 4\pi F$). In this expansion, $m_q$ counts as $\mathcal{O}(p^2)$ because $m_{\pi}^2=\lambda m_q F$ to leading order in the chiral expansion.

=== Hadron-hadron interactions ===
In some cases, chiral perturbation theory has been successful in describing the interactions between hadrons in the non-perturbative regime of the strong interaction. For instance, it can be applied to few-nucleon systems, and at next-to-next-to-leading order in the perturbative expansion, it can account for three-nucleon forces in a natural way.
