= Cluster decomposition =

Locality condition in quantum field theory

In physics, the cluster decomposition property states that experiments carried out far away from each other cannot influence each other. Usually applied to quantum field theory, it requires that vacuum expectation values of products of operators localized in bounded regions of space factorize whenever these regions becomes sufficiently distant from each other. First formulated by Eyvind Wichmann and James H. Crichton in 1963 in the context of the S-matrix, it was conjectured in Steven Weinberg's "folk theorem" that in the low energy limit the cluster decomposition property, together with Lorentz invariance and quantum mechanics, inevitably lead to quantum field theory. String theory satisfies all three of the conditions and so provides a counter-example against this being true at all energy scales.

== Formulation ==
The S-matrix $S_{\beta \alpha}$ describes the scattering amplitude of a process with an initial state $\alpha$ evolving into a final state $\beta$. If the initial and final states consist of two clusters, with $\alpha_1$ and $\beta_1$ close to each other but far from the pair $\alpha_2$ and $\beta_2$, then the cluster decomposition property requires that the S-matrix factorizes

$$S_{\beta \alpha} \rightarrow S_{\beta_1 \alpha_1}S_{\beta_2\alpha_2}$$

as the distance between the two clusters increases. The physical interpretation of this is that any two spatially well separated experiments $\alpha_1 \rightarrow \beta_1$ and $\alpha_2 \rightarrow \beta_2$ cannot influence each other. This condition is fundamental to the ability of doing physics without having to know the state of the entire universe. By expanding the S-matrix in terms of connected S-matrix elements $S_{\beta \alpha}^c$, which at the perturbative level are equivalent to connected Feynman diagrams, the cluster decomposition property can be restated as demanding that connected S-matrix elements must vanish whenever some of its clusters of particles are far apart from each other.

This position space formulation can also be reformulated in terms of the momentum space S-matrix $\tilde S^c_{\beta \alpha}$. Since its Fourier transformation gives the position space connected S-matrix, this only depends on position through exponential terms. Therefore, performing a uniform translation in a direction $\boldsymbol a$ on a subset of particles will effectively change the momentum space S-matrix as

$$\tilde S_{\beta \alpha}^c \xrightarrow{\boldsymbol x_i \rightarrow \boldsymbol x_i+\boldsymbol a} e^{i\boldsymbol a\cdot (\sum_i \boldsymbol p_i)} \tilde S_{\beta \alpha}^c.$$

By translational invariance, a translation of all particles cannot change the S-matrix, therefore $\tilde S_{\beta \alpha}$ must be proportional to a momentum conserving delta function $\delta (\Sigma \boldsymbol p)$ to ensure that the translation exponential factor vanishes. If there is an additional delta function of only a subset of momenta corresponding to some cluster of particles, then this cluster can be moved arbitrarily far through a translation without changing the S-matrix, which would violate cluster decomposition. This means that in momentum space cluster decomposition requires that the S-matrix only has a single delta function.

Cluster decomposition can also be formulated in terms of correlation functions, where for any two operators $\mathcal O_1(x)$ and $\mathcal O_2(x)$ localized to some region, the vacuum expectation values factorize as the two operators become distantly separated

$$\lim_{|\boldsymbol x|\rightarrow \infty}\langle \mathcal O_1(\boldsymbol x)\mathcal O_2(0)\rangle \rightarrow \langle \mathcal O_1\rangle \langle \mathcal O_2 \rangle.$$

This formulation allows for the property to be applied to theories that lack an S-matrix such as conformal field theories. It is in terms of these Wightman functions that the property is usually formulated in axiomatic quantum field theory. In some formulations, such as Euclidean constructive field theory, it is explicitly introduced as an axiom.

== Properties ==
If a theory is constructed from creation and annihilation operators, then the cluster decomposition property automatically holds. This can be seen by expanding out the S-matrix as a sum of Feynman diagrams which allows for the identification of connected S-matrix elements with connected Feynman diagrams. Vertices arise whenever creation and annihilation operators commute past each other leaving behind a single momentum delta function. In any connected diagram with V vertices, I internal lines and L loops, I-L of the delta functions go into fixing internal momenta, leaving V-(I-L) delta functions unfixed. A form of Euler's formula states that any graph with C disjoint connected components satisfies C = V-I+L. Since the connected S-matrix elements correspond to C=1 diagrams, these only have a single delta function and thus the cluster decomposition property, as formulated above in momentum space in terms of delta functions, holds.

Microcausality, the locality condition requiring commutation relations of local operators to vanish for spacelike separations, is a sufficient condition for the S-matrix to satisfy cluster decomposition. In this sense cluster decomposition serves a similar purpose for the S-matrix as microcausality does for fields, preventing causal influence from propagating between regions that are distantly separated. However, cluster decomposition is weaker than having no superluminal causation since it can be formulated for classical theories as well.

One key requirement for cluster decomposition is that it requires a unique vacuum state, with it failing if the vacuum state is a mixed state. The rate at which the correlation functions factorize depends on the spectrum of the theory, where if it has mass gap of mass $m$ then there is an exponential falloff $\langle \phi(x) \phi(0)\rangle \sim e^{-m|x|}$ while if there are massless particles present then it can be as slow as $1/|x|^2$.
