= Tony Skyrme =

British physicist

Tony Hilton Royle Skyrme
- Tony Skyrme in 1946
- Born: 5 December 1922; Lewisham, London, England
- Died: 25 June 1987 (aged 64); Birmingham, England, UK
- Known for: Skyrmions
- Scientific career
- Fields: Nuclear physics High-energy physics

Tony Hilton Royle Skyrme (/skɜːrm/; 5 December 1922 – 25 June 1987) was a British physicist who was born in Lewisham.

He proposed modelling the effective interaction between nucleons in nuclei by a zero-range potential. This idea is still widely used today in nuclear structure, and in equations of state for neutron stars.

Skyrme is perhaps best known for formulating the first topological soliton to model a particle, the skyrmion. Some of his most important work can be found in his selected papers. Skyrme was awarded the Hughes Medal by the Royal Society in 1985.

== Life ==
Tony Skyrme was born in Lewisham, London, the child of a bank clerk. He attended a boarding school in Lewisham and then won a scholarship to Eton. He excelled at mathematics and won several prizes in the subject at the school, including the Tomline Prize in 1939 and the Russell Prize in 1940. He went on to Trinity College, Cambridge, where he again excelled, passing part one of the mathematical tripos as a wrangler in 1942 and part three in 1943 (the other three students to graduate from Cambridge after completing part three that year were Freeman Dyson, James Lighthill and Fritz Ursell, all of whom, like Skyrme, received starred first-class degrees). While there he was president of The Archimedeans mathematics society.

With World War Two at its height after graduation he was drafted into war work as a mathematician under Rudolf Peierls who was leading a team working on the theoretical aspects of atomic energy, particularly as applied to atomic weapons. At the end of 1943 Peierls and several other of the British scientists working on the atom, were transferred to the United States to assist in the Manhattan project to build a nuclear weapon. Skyrme followed later in 1944, and worked on problems concerning the diffusion plant for isotope separation. He also used IBM punch card tabulators to calculate the implosions needed to detonate a plutonium bomb. His war time work earned him a fellowship at Oxford. But he followed Peierls to the University of Birmingham where he became a research fellow. The academic years 1948–49 and 1949–50 were spent at the Massachusetts Institute of Technology and at the Institute for Advanced Study in Princeton, respectively. In 1949 he married Dorothy Mildred Millest, a lecturer in experimental nuclear physics whom he had met at Birmingham University. They had no children.

Returning to Britain both he and Dorothy gained posts at the Atomic Energy Research Establishment at Harwell from 1950 to 1962. From 1954 he was head of the group there for theoretical nuclear physics, in which among others John Bell worked. Here he made two pioneering contributions to nuclear physics. One was to show how to handle short-range forces in a three-body problem. The other was a powerful approximation to nuclear forces, later widely used as the ‘Skyrme model’.

In 1962 he proposed a mathematical treatment of fundamental particles, in which particles such as neutrons and protons, that obey the Pauli exclusion principle, appear as manifestations of fields such as that of mesons. These entities would later in 1982 become known as Skyrmions. For this work Skyrme was awarded the Hughes medal of the Royal Society in 1985 but never received the full accolade of a fellowship there.

In 1958–59 he had travelled with his wife as tourists in a one-year overland circumnavigation of the globe by car and Land Rover. They fell in love with the lush tropical gardens of Malaysia and decided to settle there. In 1962 they left Harwell and Skyrme took up a post in the University of Malaya in Kuala Lumpur. He found this involved heavy lecturing commitments and was less than stimulating to his research work and by 1964 had returned to Britain to a post as professor of Mathematical Physics at the University of Birmingham where he remained for the rest of his career.

His hobbies were home electronics – he built his own television receiver and Hi-Fi in the 1950s; and gardening, where he and Dorothy made an early attempt at self sufficiency.

Tony was a keen amateur photographer and photographic collections from Tony and Dorothy's extensive travels are stored in the Bodleian Libraries Repository at the University of Oxford. Of particular interest in one collection are photos of a skiing trip in Saasfee, Switzerland in April 1947 with Rudolf Peierls and Klaus Fuchs, some three years before Fuchs was convicted as a Soviet Spy.

Skyrme died on 25 June 1987 in Selly Oak Hospital, Birmingham, of an embolism after a routine operation.
