= Lake Views: This World and the Universe =

- First edition
- Author: Steven Weinberg
- Language: English
- Publisher: Belknap Press of Harvard University Press
- Publication date: 2009
- Publication place: United States
- Media type: Print
- Pages: 272
- ISBN: 978-0-674-03515-7
- OCLC: 319493059

Lake Views: This World and the Universe is a 2009 book of 25 essays written by Steven Weinberg. They were published in various periodicals and books in the years 2000 to 2008. The essays deal with science, politics, history, and philosophy.

The title "Lake Views" is a reference to Weinberg's house by the side of Lake Austin, with a view of the lake from his desk.

== Essays ==
1. Waiting for a Final Theory
2. Can Science Explain Everything? Anything? (2001)
3. Peace at Last in the Science Wars
4. The Future of Science, and the Universe (2001)
5. Dark Energy
6. How Great Equations Survive
7. On Missile Defense (2002)
8. The Growing Nuclear Danger (2002)
9. Is the Universe a Computer? (2002)
10. Foreword to A Century of Nature (2003)
11. Ambling toward Apocalypse (2003)
12. What Price Glory? (2003)
13. Four Golden Lessons (2003)
14. The Wrong Stuff (2004)
15. A Turning Point?
16. About Oppenheimer (2005)
17. Einstein's Search for Unification
18. Einstein's Mistakes (2005)
19. Living in the Multiverse (2007); 2005 arXiv preprint (The essay in the book is rewritten for a non-technical readership.)
20. Against the Boycott
21. A Deadly Certitude (2007)
22. To the Postdocs (2007)
23. Science or Spacemen
24. Israel and the Liberals
25. Without God (2008)

== Reception ==
Leonard Susskind wrote,

Lake Views is a very readable account of Weinberg’s thoughts about science, politics, and life, conveying both his deep intelligence and his ruthless pursuit of truth—in physics, philosophy, and even public policy. Yet this intellectual warrior also comes off as a kind and sympathetic man who respects others, even his intellectual enemies. ... any serious reader, regardless of outlook, will ponder Weinberg’s Lake Views long after finishing the book.

A reviewer for Publishers Weekly predicted that "Weinberg fans will find nuggets of insight and wisdom."

It was reviewed by Luis Álvarez-Gaumé for CERN Courier.
