= Louise Weinberg =

American legal scholar and author

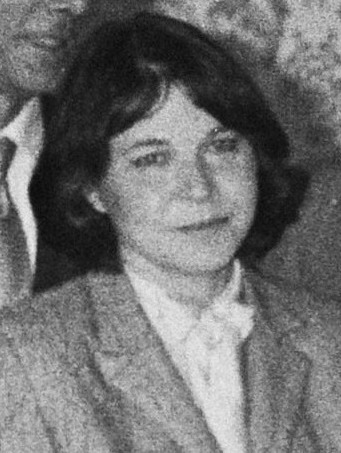
- Weinberg in 1983
- Born: Louise Goldwasser; December 5, 1932 (age 93); New York City, U.S.
- Spouse: Steven Weinberg (m. 1954; died 2021)
- Children: 1

Academic background
- Education: Cornell University (BA); Harvard University (JD, LLM)

Academic work
- Discipline: Law
- Institutions: Harvard Law School; Brandeis University; Stanford Law School; Suffolk University Law School; University of Texas Law School

Louise Weinberg (née Goldwasser; born December 5, 1932) is an American legal scholar. She is known for her writings on legal theory, due process, and choice of law, and for her groundbreaking 1994 book, a 1200-page study on federal courts.

== Biography ==
Louise Weinberg was educated at Cornell (A.B. summa) (Phi Beta Kappa), and Harvard (J.D. 1969, LL.M. 1974). She clerked for Judge Charles Edward Wyzanski Jr. and was an associate in litigation at Bingham, Dana & Gould, Boston. At Harvard, Brandeis, and Stanford she taught courses in the American legal system, constitutional law, Supreme Court history, federal courts, and the conflict of laws. In 1980 she joined the law faculty at the University of Texas, where she held the Raybourn Thompson professorship, and, later, the endowed William B. Bates Chair in the Administration of Justice, formerly held by Charles Alan Wright. In 1982 she was joined in Texas by her husband, Steven Weinberg, a Nobel laureate in physics. Louise Weinberg is author of the 1200-page study, Federal Courts: Judicial Federalism and Judicial Power (West, 1994), and numerous scholarly papers and contributions. Her works address the sources of lawmaking power and the debate on legal theory in the conflict of laws, offering a unification of conflicts theory with constitutional theory. She is a member of, and appointed adviser to, the American Law Institute, and she has frequently chaired sections of the Association of American Law Schools on Conflict of Laws and on Federal Courts. Louise Weinberg became emeritus in 2021 when she was 88 years of age.

== Contributions to legal theory ==
In 1977 Weinberg introduced the concept of "judicial federalism." She engaged in a 1989 debate with Martin Redish concerning controversial federal judicial lawmaking, and clarified the nature of federal common law. Weinberg concentrated on choice-of-law theory, and proposed a reconceptualization of the field, ultimately achieving a unification of the concepts of due process, rationality, and tiered scrutiny with choice of law. Weinberg became interested in uncovering hidden rationales in Supreme Court cases, and in this interest clarified the causative role of the Dred Scott case in the coming of the Civil War, countering revisionist normalization of Dred Scott while showing that judicial attempts to reverse Dred Scott, as opposed to constitutional amendment, would have been counterproductive. In 2003, when Marbury v. Madison, the early Supreme Court case placing the federal government under the rule of law, came under revisionist attack, Weinberg published her defense of the case. Throughout she was interested in the problem of instantiating justice within the American dual-law, dual-court, multistate legal systems, and on the histories of the times in the backgrounds of supreme court cases on these systems.

== Retirement: Steven Weinberg legacy & Louise Weinberg Lecture ==
Louise Weinberg retired in 2021. She edited the memoirs of her husband, the Nobel laureate physicist, Steven Weinberg (1933-2021). She donated the papers of Steven Weinberg to the Harry Ransom Center at the University of Texas.

In retirement Louise Weinberg published a novel, Up at the Castlereigh (2023), and three volumes of short stories, Millennial Guy and Other Stories (2023), The English Lad and Other Stories (2023), and The Poet and Other Stories (2025). In 2023 the University of Texas School of Law hosted the inaugural Louise Weinberg Lecture in the Administration of Justice. The inaugural lecture was delivered by Vicki Jackson.

== Publications ==
BOOKS:

- Federal Courts: Judicial Federalism and Judicial Power (West Pub. Co., 1200 pp. 1994) & Supps.
- Conflict of Laws (Matthew Bender 2011, 2002, 1996) (co-authors William Richman and William Reynolds).

RECENT SCHOLARLY PAPERS:

- Sovereign Immunity and Interstate Government Tort, 54 U. MICH. J. L. Rev. 1-85 (2020)
- Age of Unreason: Rationality and the Regulatory State, 53 U. MICH. J. L. REF. 1-80 (2019)
- Luther v. Borden: A Taney-Court Mystery Solved, 37 PACE LAW REVIEW 700-764 (2017)
- A Radically Transformed Restatement for Conflicts, 2015 U. OF ILLINOIS L. REV. 1999–2052 (2015)
- What We Don't Talk About When We Talk About Extraterritoriality: Kiobel and the Conflict of Laws, 99 CORNELL L. REV. 1471–1531 (2014)
- A General Theory of Governance: Due Process and Lawmaking Power, 54 WM. & MARY L. REV. 1057–1121 (2013)
- Unlikely Beginnings of Modern Constitutional Thought, 15 U. PA. J. CONST. L. 291-330 (2012)

EARLIER NOTABLE PAPERS:

- Courts, United States Federal," THE OXFORD INTERNATIONAL ENCYCLOPEDIA OF LEGAL HISTORY 255-262 (2009)
- Dred Scott and the Crisis of 1860, in Symposium, 82 CHI-KENT L. REV. 97-140 (2007)
- Theory Wars in the Conflict of Laws, 103 MICH. L. REV. 1631–1670 (2005).
- Our Marbury, 89 VA. L. REV. 1235–1412 (2003)
- "Of Theory and Theodicy: The Problem of Immoral Law," in LAW AND JUSTICE IN A MULTISTATE WORLD: A TRIBUTE TO ARTHUR T. VON MEHREN, 473-502 (Symeon Symeonides, ed. 2002)
- When Courts Decide Elections: The Constitutionality of Bush v. Gore, in Symposium, 82 B.U. L. REV. 609-666 (2002).
- Of Sovereignty and Union: The Legends of Alden, 76 NOTRE DAME L. REV. 1113–1182 (2001).
- Holmes' Failure, 96 MICH. L. REV. 691-723 (1997)
- The Federal-State Conflict of Laws: "Actual" Conflicts, 70 TEX. L. REV. 1743–1798 (1992)
- Against Comity, 80 GEORGETOWN L. J. 53-94 (1991)
- The Monroe Mystery Solved: Beyond the "Unhappy History" Theory of Civil Rights Litigation, in Symposium, 1991 B.Y.U. L. REV. 737-765 (1991)
- Federal Common Law, 83 NW. U. L. REV. 805-852 (1989)
- Choice of Law and Minimal Scrutiny, 49 U. CHI. L. REV. 440-488 (1982).
- The New Judicial Federalism, 29 STAN. L. REV. 1191–1244 (1977)

CONTRIBUTED:

- Courts, United States Federal, in II THE OXFORD INTERNATIONAL ENCYCLOPEDIA OF LEGAL HISTORY 255-262 (2009)
- Of Theory and Theodicy: The Problem of Immoral Law, LAW AND JUSTICE IN A MULTISTATE WORLD 473-502 (Symeonides ed., 2002)
- A New Judicial Federalism? A NEW AMERICA? (Graubard ed., 1978)

ANTHOLOGIZED:

- On Departing from Forum Law, A CONFLICT-OF-LAWS ANTHOLOGY 122 (Gene R. Shreve ed. 1997, 2012).
- Choice of Law and Minimal Scrutiny, A CONFLICT-OF-LAWS ANTHOLOGY 339 (Gene R. Shreve, ed. 1997, 2012).
- The New Judicial Federalism, in FEDERALISM (A J. Bellia, ed., 2011).
- Federal Common Law, FEDERALISM (A. J. Bellia ed. 2011)

PROCEEDINGS:

- The Economic Rights of Individuals, PROCEEDINGS OF THE ANNUAL MEETING—THE PHILOSOPHICAL SOCIETY OF TEXAS (2017)
- Motion and Debate, in PROCEEDINGS OF THE AMERICAN LAW INSTITUTE, 79TH ANNUAL MEETING, at 468–9, 481–3, 485-6 (2002.).
- Motion and Debate, in PROCEEDINGS OF THE AMERICAN LAW INSTITUTE, 70TH ANNUAL MEETING at 255, 262, 267–68, 274-75 (1993) (Reprinted in part, 54 LA. L. REV. 837 (1994) by editors of the review as basis of a Symposium).
- Motion and Debate, in PROCEEDINGS OF THE AMERICAN LAW INSTITUTE, 69TH ANNUAL MEETING, at 211-216 (1992) (motion carried).
- Motion and Debate, in PROCEEDINGS OF THE AMERICAN LAW INSTITUTE, 65th ANNUAL MEETING, at 229-337 (motion carried); Comments, 344-45 (1988).

CITED BY:

- Supreme Court of the United States, Phillips Petroleum Co. v. Shutts, Justice Stevens, concurring and dissenting (1985) (slip op.)
- Justice Stephen Breyer, MAKING OUR DEMOCRACY WORK: A JUDGE'S VIEW (2014) (variously citing Weinberg's Our Marbury.)
- Peter S. Canellos, THE GREAT DISSENTER (2021), at 486, 565.
- Edward A. Purcell, Jr., BRANDEIS AND THE PROGRESSIVE CONSTITUTION (2000) (Chapter IV in entirety)
- Stuart, CONCEPTS OF FEDERALISM (1979)
- United States Court of Appeals (5th Cir.. 2020)
- United States Court of Appeals (4th Cir. 2016)
- United States Court of Appeals (D.C. Cir. 2010)
- United States District Court, Eastern Dist. N.Y. (2000)
- Supreme Court of New Jersey (2008)
- Court of Appeals of Arizona (1997)

== Direct links ==
- Steven Weinberg (American physicist)
- Charles Alan Wright
- Philip Bobbitt
- Charles Edward Wyzanski Jr.
- Henry M. Hart Jr.
- Karl Llewellyn
- Oliver Wendell Holmes Jr.
