= To Explain the World: The Discovery of Modern Science =

To Explain the World: The Discovery of Modern Science is a history of explanation in science by Steven Weinberg published in 2015. Weinberg covers the historical period from the ancient Greeks, through the Arabs of the Middle Ages, to Tycho, Galileo and Newton, focussing on physics and astronomy, and contrasts it with modern-day scientific thinking. For example, he discusses the failure of scientists such as Newton to consider the effects of errors of measurement, or the need for "fine tuning", multiple unexplained constants introduced to make the theories work seen in both the epicycles of ancient astronomy and in modern-day cosmology, and contrasts the methods used with those of the physicists of his own era.

Although the book is billed as popular science, it consists of dense, textbook-like material. Weinberg goes into great detail about the calculations of the ancients, even going as far as to reproduce their calculations, and find errors. He details the calculations in 35 "technical notes" at the end of the book.

The title was suggested by Weinberg's wife.

== Contents ==
Part I: Greek Physics

- Chapter 1: Matter and Poetry

Weinberg offers a thesis that the Greeks were poets rather than scientists.

- Chapter 2: Music and Mathematics

A discussion of music and its relation to rational numbers, and the relationship between mathematics and physics.

- Chapter 3: Motion and Philosophy

On Aristotle's understanding of motion.

- Chapter 4: Hellenistic Physics and Technology

Later Greek figures such as Archimedes, Euclid, and Ptolemy.

- Chapter 5: Ancient Science and Religion

The conflicts between the various religions of the ancient world and scientific endeavour.

Part II: Greek Astronomy

- Chapter 6: The Uses of Astronomy

Astronomy as a navigation and time keeping aid, and the difficulties of understanding the sky

- Chapter 7: Measuring the Sun, Moon, and Earth

Early astronomical calculations by Hipparchus and others.

- Chapter 8: The Problem of the Planets

Theories of the planets and what they failed to take into account.

Part III: The Middle Ages

- Chapter 9: The Arabs

Arab science, the role of Islam in suppressing science.

- Chapter 10: Medieval Europe

The slow rediscovery of Greek knowledge in Europe from the Arab world.

Part IV: The Scientific Revolution

- Chapter 11: The Solar System Solved

Copernicus, Tycho, Galileo, and Kepler.

- Chapter 12: Experiments Begun

Galileo's inclined planes, pendulum clocks, air pressure.

- Chapter 13: Method Reconsidered

Assessments of Francis Bacon and Descartes' influence.

- Chapter 14: The Newtonian Synthesis

Isaac Newton and his work.

- Chapter 15: The Grand Reduction

A rapid journey to the modern day.

=== Technical Notes ===
Thirty-five sections on geometry and other topics, using high school mathematics. Thales' theorem, rational numbers, spherical trigonometry, etc.

== Reception ==
=== Whig history debate ===
Historian Steven Shapin, the author of The Scientific Revolution, who is mentioned by name in the book, wrote a scathing review of the book. He described the book as "Whig history" and stated that Weinberg's expertise in physics did not translate to expertise in history. This attracted several commentaries, a response by Weinberg, and an exchange between Weinberg and Arthur Silverstein in the New York Review of Books in February 2016.

=== Other reviews ===
In the UK, the book was reviewed by The Observer, The Guardian, and the Financial Times. Peter Forbes in The Independent described it as "A great book, a necessary book for our time".

In the US, the book was reviewed by the New York Review of Books, and Physics Today.

== Book information ==
- Harper Perennial paperback: ISBN 978-0-06-234666-7
- Penguin eBook: ISBN 9780241196656 (?)
- Penguin paperback: ISBN 978-0-141-98087-4
