= Mannque Rho =

South Korean physicist (1936–2026)

- Born: 14 December 1936; Hamyang, Gyeongsangnam-do, Korea.
- Died: 19 March 2026 (aged 89); Paris, France
- Education: Clark University, UC Berkeley
- Known for: Brown-Rho Scaling
- Awards: Paul Langevin Prize (1985); Gay-Lussac Humboldt Prize (1995); Ho-Am Prize in science (2002)
- Scientific career
- Fields: Physics
- Workplaces: CEA Saclay

Korean name
- Hangul: 노만규
- RR: No Mangyu
- MR: No Man'gyu

Mannque Rho (Korean: 노만규; 14 December 1936 – 19 March 2026) was a South Korean-French theoretical physicist. He has contributed to theoretical nuclear/hadron physics and suggested Brown-Rho Scaling with Gerald E. Brown which predicts how the masses of the hadrons disappear in hot and dense environments.

== Biography and Career ==
Mannque Rho was born in Hamyang, Gyeongsangnam-do, Korea in 1936. He graduated from Kyunggi High School and started his college study at the political science department of Seoul National University. After that he moved to the United States and entered Clark University. At first he registered for the pre-med study but later changed his major to chemistry and received his bachelor's degree in 1960. During his college studies, he attended some lectures about the structure of nuclei by Ben Roy Mottelson and Niels Bohr who were visiting the university at that time. He was affected by them and this led him to study hadron physics. He received his Ph.D. in nuclear physics from University of California, Berkeley in 1965. Next year he visited CEA Saclay, France and met his future wife (German) and decided to settle down in France. He became a professor of the institute and has been there ever since.

Rho was a visiting scholar at the European Organization for Nuclear Research (CERN) in Geneva, Switzerland, in 1969/70.

He held many inviting positions and has been a visiting professor four times at State University of New York at Stony Brook during 1973 to 1989. He was a professor in School of Physics at Korea Institute for Advanced Study from 2002 to 2003. Rho received an honorary Doctor of Science from his alma mater Clark University in 2003. Later he was a research professor of theoretical physics, 'Expert Senior du CEA' and scientific counselor at CEA Saclay, France and also a chair professor of Hanyang University, South Korea from 2009.

Rho died on 19 March 2026, at the age of 89.

== Research ==
Rho is known for his works on the properties of hadrons in normal as well as extreme environments present in heavy nuclei, relativistic heavy-ion collisions and compact stars. In the early 1970s he started to study the chiral symmetry of Quantum Chromodynamics in nuclear medium. QCD was poorly understood at that time and he explained how chiral symmetry appears in nuclear structure. In 1979 he and Gerald E. Brown implemented chiral symmetry in an effective theory of the nucleon in the form of chiral bag model according to which quarks exist freely in a bag surrounded by a pion cloud. In 1991 Rho and Brown derived a scaling property of hadrons in hot and dense medium, now known as Brown-Rho scaling which predicted how the masses of the hadrons disappear in hot (early universe) and dense (neutron star) environments.

BR scaling has been tested experimentally in several electro-weak processes involving heavy nuclei. It has explained the CERN heavy-ion experiments on dilepton production and is expected to explain some features of the experiments at RHIC. In nuclear astro-physics, it adds to the understanding of supernovae explosions and the structure of compact stars. In his final years, Rho was working on superdense hadronic QCD properties and astro-hadron physics.
