= Che-Ming Ko =

Taiwanese physicist

Che-Ming Ko (柯治明; born 1943) is a Taiwanese physicist, focusing in nuclear theory, currently University Distinguished Professor at Texas A&M University and an Elected Fellow of the American Physical Society in 1994.

== Education ==
Ko received a B.S. degree from Tunghai University in Taiwan. Ko received a M.S. degree from McMaster University in Canada. Ko received his Ph.D. in 1973 from State University of New York at Stony Brook, under dissertation advisor Gerald E. Brown.
