= Gerald E. Brown =

American theoretical physicist

Gerald Edward Brown
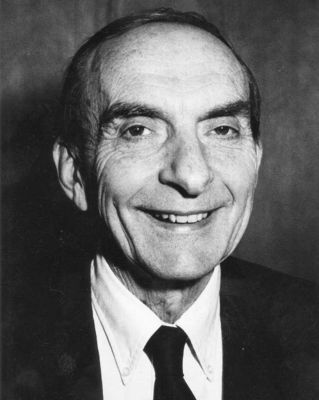
- Born: July 22, 1926; Brookings, South Dakota, US
- Died: May 31, 2013 (aged 86); New York City, US
- Education: University of Wisconsin; Yale University; University of Birmingham
- Known for: Elucidating the effects of various nuclear constituents on nucleon interactions and nucleon structure
- Awards: Hans Bethe Prize; Tom W. Bonner Prize in Nuclear Physics; Max Planck Medal
- Scientific career
- Fields: Quantum mechanics, Nuclear Physics
- Workplaces: Stony Brook University; NORDITA; Princeton University
- Theses: Effects of nuclear motion of the fine and hyperfine structure of hydrogen (1950); Contributions to the theory of electron interactions, gamma ray scattering, high energy scattering and low energy nuclear reactions (1957)
- Doctoral advisors: Gregory Breit (at Yale); Rudolf Peierls (at Birmingham)
- Doctoral students: Elliott H. Lieb; Che-Ming Ko; Ulf-G. Meißner; Kevin S. Bedell
- Website: tonic.physics.sunysb.edu/faculty/brown/

Gerald Edward Brown (also known as Gerry Brown, July 22, 1926 - May 31, 2013) was an American theoretical physicist who worked on nuclear physics and astrophysics. Since 1968 he had been a professor at the Stony Brook University. He was a distinguished professor emeritus of the C. N. Yang Institute for Theoretical Physics at Stony Brook University.

== Life and work ==
Brown received his bachelor's degree in physics in 1946 from the University of Wisconsin and in 1948 his master's degree from Yale University, where in 1950 he earned his PhD (under Gregory Breit). In 1957 he earned his D.Sc. from the University of Birmingham in England (under Rudolf Peierls), where he was from 1955 docent and in 1959/60 was professor for theoretical physics. From 1960 to 1985 he was a professor at NORDITA in Copenhagen and concurrently from 1964 to 1968 Professor at Princeton and since 1968 he was a professor at the State University of New York at Stony Brook, where he became Distinguished Professor of Physics in 1988.

Brown worked first in theoretical atomic physics (self-ionization of the vacuum with Geoff Ravenhall in 1951, Lamb shift in heavy atoms, electron-electron interactions, precise calculation of Rayleigh scattering). In nuclear physics, where he was for decades one of the leading theorists of nuclear many body problems in particle physics, he worked, for example, with Mark Bolsteri on the giant dipole resonance, with Tom Kuo on effective interactions of nucleons in atomic nuclei, as well on chiral invariant theories of the atomic nucleus (with Mannque Rho and Dan-Olof Riska), that is to say, field theories with pions and other mesons. Starting in the 1970s he worked frequently in collaboration with Hans Bethe on the nuclear-physics-derived equations of state in the theory of compact stars (gravitational collapse, supernovae, double stars with compact stars as partners, development of black holes, gamma ray bursts). Since the end of the 1970s, Brown worked on bag models of nucleons (Chiral bag model). In the 1980s he also worked together with K. Bedell on Fermi liquid theory. Toward the end of Bethe's life, Bethe told Brown to explain his work to the rest of the world.

== Awards and recognition ==
Brown received an honorary doctorate from the universities of Helsinki (1982), Birmingham (1990) and Copenhagen (1998).

- Fellow of The Royal Danish Academy of Sciences and Letters
- Fellow of the American Physical Society
- 1966 Silver Medal of the University of Helsinki
- 1974 Haederspris of the Niels Bohr Institute
- 1975 Fellow of the American Academy of Arts and Sciences
- 1976 Boris Pregel Award of the New York Academy of Sciences
- 1978 Academician of the National Academy of Sciences
- 1982 Tom W. Bonner Prize in Nuclear Physics of the American Physical Society
- 1992 John Price Wetherill Medal of the Franklin Institute
- 1996 Max Planck Medal of the Deutschen Physikalischen Gesellschaft
- 2001 Hans A. Bethe Prize of the American Physical Society
- Fellow of the Norwegian Academy of Science and Letters.

== Selected works ==
- "Unified theory of nuclear models", North Holland, Interscience 1964, new edition entitled "Unified theory of nuclear models and forces", North Holland 1967, 1971
- with A. D. Jackson "The Nucleon Nucleon Interaction", North Holland 1976
- "Many body problems", North Holland 1972
- with Ravenhall "On the interaction of two electrons", Proceedings of the Royal Society A 208, 1951, 552
- with Bolsteri "Dipole state in nuclei", Physical Review Letters, Bd.3, 1959, 472
- "Die Entdeckung der Multipol-Riesenresonanzen in Atomkernen", Physikalische Blätter 1997, S.710 (Vortrag aus Anlass der Verleihung der Max Planck Medaille der DPG)
- with Kuo "Structure of finite nuclei and the free Nucleon-Nucleon interaction: an application to O18 and F18", Nuclear Physics A, Bd.85, 1966, S.40–86
- Gerald E. Brown, Mannque Rho (1979). "The little bag". Phys. Lett. B. 82 (2): 177–180. Bibcode:1979PhLB...82..177B. doi:10.1016/0370-2693(79)90729-9.
- with Rho "Towards a basis in QCD for nuclear physics", Comments on Nuclear and Particle Physics Bd. 16, 1986, 245
- Gerald E. Brown, Mannque Rho (1991). "Scaling effective Lagrangians in a dense medium". Phys. Rev. Lett. 66 (21): 2720–2723. Bibcode:1991PhRvL..66.2720B. doi:10.1103/PhysRevLett.66.2720. PMID 10043599.
- "The structure of the Nucleon", Physics Today January 1983
- with Zahed "The Skyrme Model", Physics Reports, Bd.142, 1986, S.1–102
- with Weise, Baym, Speth "Relativistic effects in nuclear physics", Comments on Nuclear and Particle Physics, Bd. 17, 1987, 37
- with Bethe, Applegate, Lattimer "Evolution of state in the gravitational collapse of stars", Nuclear Physics A 324, 1979, S.487
- Hans A. Bethe, Gerald E. Brown (1998). "Evolution of Binary Compact Objects That Merge". The Astrophysical Journal. 506 (2): 780–789. arXiv:astro-ph/9802084. Bibcode:1998ApJ...506..780B. doi:10.1086/306265.
- with Bethe "How a Supernova explodes", Scientific American Mai 1985
