= Nonlinear realization =

In mathematical physics, nonlinear realization of a Lie group G possessing a Cartan subgroup H is a particular induced representation of G. In fact, it is a representation of a Lie algebra $\mathfrak g$ of G in a neighborhood of its origin. A nonlinear realization, when restricted to the subgroup H reduces to a linear representation.

A nonlinear realization technique is part and parcel of many field theories with spontaneous symmetry breaking, e.g., chiral models, chiral symmetry breaking, Goldstone boson theory, classical Higgs field theory, gauge gravitation theory and supergravity.

Let G be a Lie group and H its Cartan subgroup which admits a linear representation in a vector space V. A Lie algebra $\mathfrak g$ of G splits into the sum $\mathfrak g=\mathfrak h \oplus \mathfrak f$ of the Cartan subalgebra $\mathfrak h$ of H and its supplement $\mathfrak f$, such that

$$[\mathfrak f,\mathfrak f]\subset \mathfrak h, \qquad [\mathfrak f,\mathfrak h
]\subset \mathfrak f.$$

(In physics, for instance, $\mathfrak h$ amount to vector generators and $\mathfrak f$ to axial ones.)

There exists an open neighborhood U of the unit of G such that any element $g\in U$ is uniquely brought into the form

$$g=\exp(F)\exp(I), \qquad F\in\mathfrak f, \qquad I\in\mathfrak h.$$

Let $U_G$ be an open neighborhood of the unit of G such that $U_G^2\subset U$, and let $U_0$ be an open neighborhood of the H-invariant center $\sigma_0$ of the quotient G/H which consists of elements

$$\sigma=g\sigma_0=\exp(F)\sigma_0, \qquad g\in U_G.$$

Then there is a local section $s(g\sigma_0)=\exp(F)$ of $G\to G/H$ over $U_0$.

With this local section, one can define the induced representation, called the nonlinear realization, of elements $g\in U_G\subset G$ on $U_0\times V$ given by the expressions

$$g\exp(F)=\exp(F')\exp(I'), \qquad g:(\exp(F)\sigma_0,v)\to (\exp(F')\sigma_0,\exp(I')v).$$

The corresponding nonlinear realization of a Lie algebra $\mathfrak g$ of G takes the following form.

Let $\{F_\alpha\}$, $\{I_a\}$ be the bases for $\mathfrak f$ and $\mathfrak h$, respectively, together with the commutation relations

$$[I_a,I_b]= c^d_{ab}I_d, \qquad [F_\alpha,F_\beta]= c^d_{\alpha\beta}I_d,
\qquad [F_\alpha,I_b]= c^\beta_{\alpha b}F_\beta.$$

Then a desired nonlinear realization of $\mathfrak g$ in $\mathfrak f\times V$ reads

$$F_\alpha: (\sigma^\gamma F_\gamma,v)\to (F_\alpha(\sigma^\gamma)F_\gamma,
F_\alpha(v)), \qquad  I_a: (\sigma^\gamma F_\gamma,v)\to  (I_a(\sigma^\gamma)F_\gamma,I_av),$$,

$$F_\alpha(\sigma^\gamma)=
\delta^\gamma_\alpha +
\frac{1}{12}(c^\beta_{\alpha\mu}c^\gamma_{\beta\nu} - 3 c^b_{\alpha\mu}c^\gamma_{\nu
b})\sigma^\mu\sigma^\nu, \qquad I_a(\sigma^\gamma)=c^\gamma_{a\nu}\sigma^\nu,$$

up to the second order in $\sigma^\alpha$.

In physical models, the coefficients $\sigma^\alpha$ are treated as Goldstone fields. Similarly, nonlinear realizations of Lie superalgebras are considered.

== See also ==
- Induced representation
- Chiral model
