= Pion decay constant =

Physical constant

In particle physics, the pion decay constant is the square root of the coefficient in front of the kinetic term for the pion in the low-energy effective action. It is dimensionally an energy scale and it determines the strength of the chiral symmetry breaking. The values are:

$$f_{\pi^{\pm}} = 130.41 \pm 0.03 \pm 0.20~\text{MeV}$$
$$f_{\pi^{0}} = 130 \pm 5~\text{MeV}$$

There are several conventions which differ by factors of $\sqrt{2}$. The textbook by Weinberg uses the value 184 MeV. The textbook by Peskin and Schroeder uses the value 93 MeV.

According to Brown–Rho scaling, the masses of nucleons and most light mesons decrease at finite density as the ratio of the in-medium pion decay rate to the free-space pion decay constant. The pion mass is an exception to Brown-Rho scaling because the pion's mass is protected by its Goldstone boson nature.
