= Steven Weinberg =

American theoretical physicist (1933–2021)

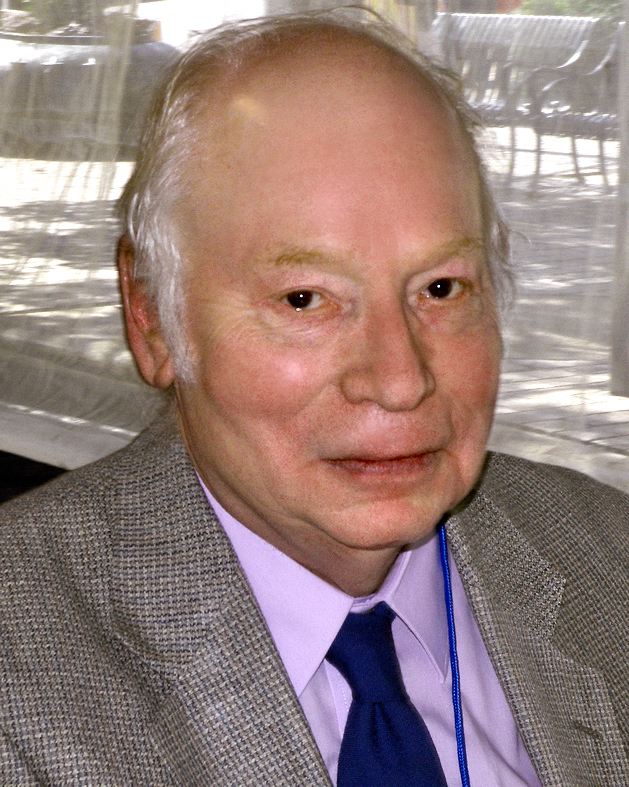
- Weinberg at the 2010 Texas Book Festival
- Born: May 3, 1933; New York City, U.S.
- Died: July 23, 2021 (aged 88); Austin, Texas, U.S.
- Resting place: Texas State Cemetery
- Education: Cornell University (BA); Princeton University (PhD)
- Known for: Electroweak interaction; Effective action; Folk theorem
- Spouse: Louise Goldwasser (m. 1954)
- Awards: Nobel Prize in Physics (1979); Fellow of the Royal Society (1981); National Medal of Science (1991)
- Scientific career
- Fields: Theoretical physics
- Workplaces: University of Texas (1982–2021); Harvard (1973–1983); MIT (1969–1973); Berkeley (1960–1969)
- Thesis: The role of strong interactions in decay processes (1957)
- Doctoral advisor: Sam Treiman
- Weinberg's voice Talking to Richard Dawkins

Steven Weinberg (/ˈwaɪnbɜːrɡ/; May 3, 1933 – July 23, 2021) was an American theoretical physicist. He was one of the main developers of the standard model of particle physics.

Weinberg held the Josey Regental Chair in Science at the University of Texas at Austin. His research on elementary particles and physical cosmology was honored with numerous prizes and awards. He shared the 1979 Nobel Prize in Physics with Abdus Salam and Sheldon Glashow for their contributions to the theory of the unified weak and electromagnetic interaction between elementary particles.

Weinberg also had an extensive career as a writer. His first textbook was Gravitation and Cosmology (1972). His three-volume series The Quantum Theory of Fields is considered a classic. He also wrote popular science, beginning with The First Three Minutes. He occasionally wrote articles on various subjects for The New York Review of Books and other periodicals.

== Early life ==
Steven Weinberg was born on May 3, 1933, in New York City. His parents were Jewish; his father, Frederick, worked as a court stenographer, while his mother, Eva (née Israel), was a housewife who had immigrated from Germany.

In a posthumously published memoir, Weinberg wrote: "Whatever native intelligence and intellectual curiosity I may have, I owe to my parents, in particular, my father."

Weinberg first became interested in physics after inheriting a chemistry set from a cousin. His interest in chemistry led him to want to learn about quantum mechanics. He found inspiration in popular science, particularly George Gamow and James Jeans. He graduated from Bronx High School of Science in 1950. In the same graduating class was Sheldon Glashow, whose research, independent of Weinberg's, resulted in their sharing the 1979 Nobel in physics with Abdus Salam. Weinberg, Glashow, and Gerald Feinberg were friends at the school, and Weinberg initially shared an apartment with Glashow when he started at Cornell University, but moved out due to Glashow's "devil-may-care irresponsibility".

In 1954, Weinberg received his bachelor's degree from Cornell University, where he majored in physics. There he resided at the Telluride House.

He started graduate studies at the Niels Bohr Institute in Copenhagen. After a year, Weinberg moved to Princeton University, where he earned his Ph.D. in physics in 1957, completing his dissertation, The Role of Strong Interactions in Decay Processes, under the supervision of Sam Treiman. He chose to complete his PhD very quickly after his wife grew bored in Princeton and moved back to New York, leaving him alone.

== Career and research ==
After completing his Ph.D., Weinberg worked as a postdoctoral researcher at Columbia University from 1957 to 1959 and then at the University of California, Berkeley. He was promoted to faculty at Berkeley in 1960. Weinberg researched the high-energy behavior of quantum field theory, symmetry breaking, pion scattering, infrared photons and quantum gravity. During this time he developed the approach to quantum field theory described in his book The Quantum Theory of Fields and started to write his textbook Gravitation and Cosmology, having taken up an interest in general relativity after the discovery of cosmic microwave background radiation.

Weinberg collaborated with Abdus Salam during a stay at Imperial College in the 1961-1962 academic year.

=== Electroweak unification ===
In 1966, Weinberg left Berkeley and accepted a lecturer position at Harvard. In 1967 he was a visiting professor at MIT, where he proposed his model of unification of electromagnetism and nuclear weak forces (such as those involved in beta-decay and kaon-decay), with the masses of the force-carriers of the weak part of the interaction explained by spontaneous symmetry breaking. One of its predictions was the existence of the Higgs boson. Weinberg's model, now known as the electroweak unification theory, had the same symmetry structure that Glashow proposed in 1961: both included the then-unknown weak interaction mechanism between leptons known as neutral current and mediated by the Z boson.

The 1973 experimental discovery of weak neutral currents that implied the Z boson's existence was one verification of the electroweak unification. In 1979, after the 1978 discovery of the predicted amount of parity violation due to Z bosons' mixing with electromagnetic interactions, Weinberg was awarded the Nobel Prize in Physics with Glashow and Salam, who had independently proposed a theory of electroweak unification based on spontaneous symmetry breaking.

The 1967 paper in which Weinberg presented this theory is one of the most cited works in high-energy physics. It cited Higgs's name first, and it has been suggested that the paper's popularity is a reason the Higgs boson was named after Higgs rather than other scientists who also suggested the mechanism.

=== 1970s and later ===
After his seminal 1967 work on the unification of weak and electromagnetic interactions, Weinberg worked in many aspects of particle physics, quantum field theory, gravity, supersymmetry, superstrings and cosmology. In the 1970s, Weinberg proposed a modification of the Standard Model that did not contain the Higgs boson. He also proposed a theory later known as technicolor, in which new strong interactions resolve the hierarchy problem.

Weinberg spent the summer of 1972 trying, without success, to work out the reasons for quark and lepton masses, and said that was the mystery he most wanted to see solved in his lifetime.

Weinberg became Eugene Higgins Professor of Physics at Harvard University in 1973, a post he held until 1983. In 1979 with his "folk theorem", he pioneered the modern view on the renormalization of quantum field theory that considers all quantum field theories effective field theories. This approach allowed the development of an effective theory of quantum gravity and other developments, and is a topic of considerable interest in current research.

In 1982 Weinberg moved to the University of Texas at Austin as the Jack S. Josey-Welch Foundation Regents Chair in Science. His wife, Louise, had been given a professorship at the University of Texas School of Law in 1980, and, missing her, Weinberg moved to Texas to be nearer. He taught at the University of Texas until his death, publishing his final textbook, Foundations of Modern Physics, the year he died.

=== Other contributions ===
Besides his scientific research, Weinberg was a public spokesman for science, testifying before Congress in support of the Superconducting Super Collider, writing articles for The New York Review of Books, and giving various lectures on the larger meaning of science. His first popular science book, The First Three Minutes: A Modern View of the Origin of the Universe (1977), described the origin of the universe in the Big Bang. Dreams of a Final Theory (1992) made the case for reductionism and the Superconducting Super Collider.

While still teaching physics, in later years Weinberg turned his hand to the history of science, efforts that culminated in To Explain the World: The Discovery of Modern Science (2015).

Weinberg served as a consultant at the U.S. Arms Control and Disarmament Agency, as president of the Philosophical Society of Texas, and as a member of the Board of Editors of Daedalus magazine, the Council of Scholars of the Library of Congress, the JASON group of defense consultants, and many other boards and committees.

== Personal life and archive ==
In 1954, Weinberg married legal scholar Louise Goldwasser. They had a daughter, Elizabeth.

Weinberg usually worked from home, with his wife's office next door and a TV set on his desk showing classic movies or history documentaries. He said his wife's proximity and the TV were the keys to his productivity.

Weinberg died on July 23, 2021, aged 88, at a hospital in Austin, where he had been undergoing treatment for several weeks. Weinberg's papers were donated to the Harry Ransom Center at the University of Texas. He is buried in the Texas State Cemetery.

== Views ==
Weinberg identified as a liberal.

=== Religion ===
Weinberg was an atheist. Before he was an advocate of the Big Bang theory, Weinberg said: "The steady-state theory is philosophically the most attractive theory because it least resembles the account given in Genesis."

=== Israel ===
Weinberg was known for his support of Israel, which he characterized as "the 'most exposed salient' in a war between liberal democracies and Muslim theocracies." He wrote the 1997 essay "Zionism and Its Adversaries" on the issue.

Weinberg canceled a planned trip to a cosmology conference at Durham University in 2006 because of the National Association of Teachers in Further and Higher Education's boycotts of Israel, and canceled a trip to Imperial College in 2007 due to the boycott of Israeli products by the National Union of Journalists and other bodies. He said: "Given the history of the attacks on Israel and the oppressiveness and aggressiveness of other countries in the Middle East and elsewhere, boycotting Israel indicated a moral blindness for which it is hard to find any explanation other than antisemitism."

=== Manned spaceflight ===
Weinberg opposed manned spaceflight, arguing it was too costly and produced little of scientific value while taking funds away from more scientifically useful unmanned missions.

=== Guns ===
In 2016, Weinberg became a default leader for faculty and students opposed to a new law allowing the carrying of concealed guns in University of Texas classrooms. He announced that he would prohibit guns in his classes, and said he would stand by his decision to violate university regulations in this matter even if sued.

== Honors and awards ==
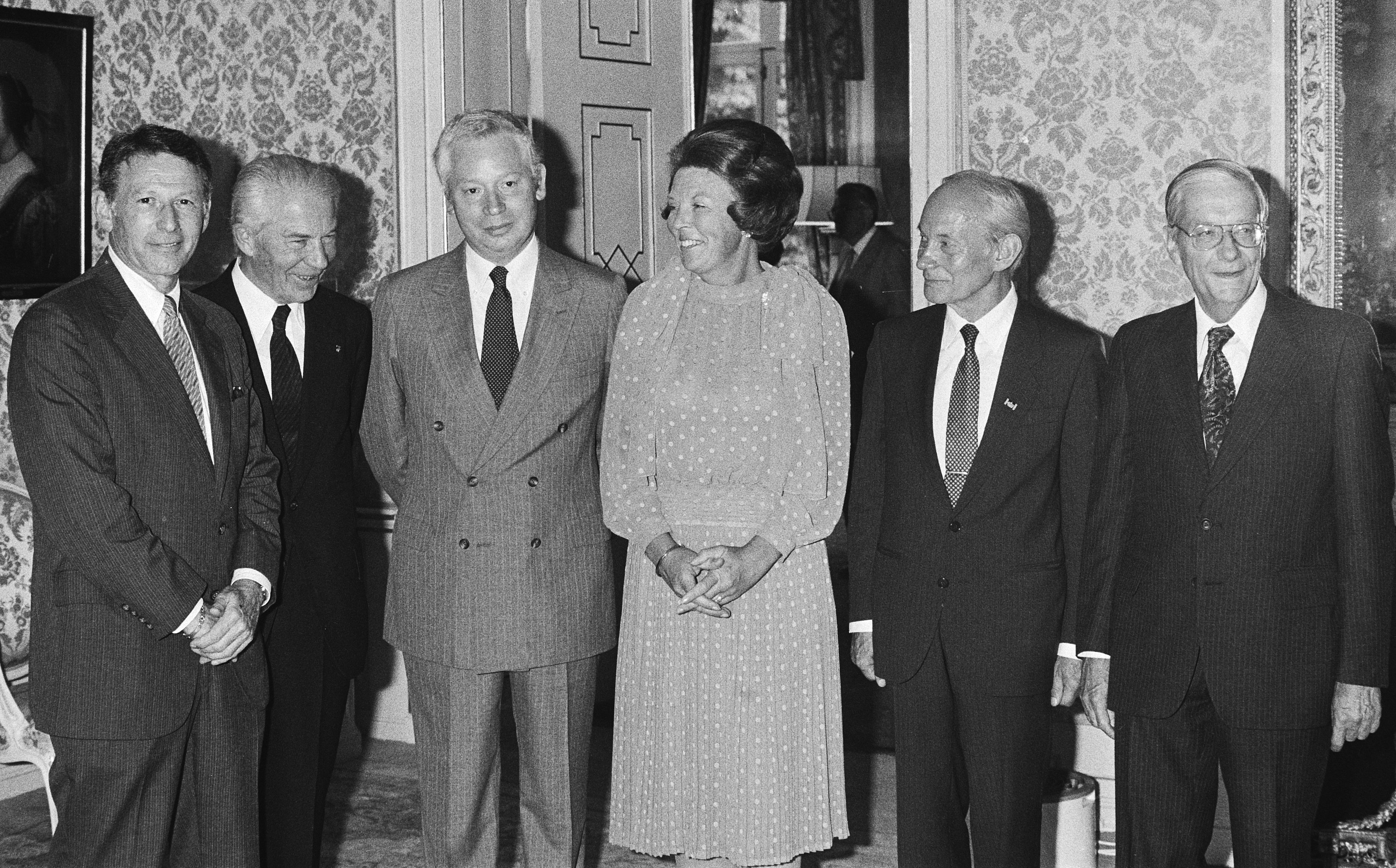
Queen Beatrix meets Nobel laureates in 1983. Weinberg is third from left.

- Honorary Doctor of Science degrees from eleven institutions: University of Chicago, Knox College, University of Rochester, Yale University, City University of New York, Dartmouth College, Weizmann Institute, Clark University, Washington College, Columbia University, Bates College.
- American Academy of Arts and Sciences, elected 1968
- Fellow of the American Physical Society, elected 1971
- National Academy of Sciences, elected 1972
- J. Robert Oppenheimer Memorial Prize, 1973
- Richtmyer Memorial Award, 1974
- Dannie Heineman Prize for Mathematical Physics, 1977
- American Institute of Physics - US Steel Foundation Science Writing Award for The First Three Minutes, 1977
- Elliott Cresson Medal (Franklin Institute), 1979
- Nobel Prize in Physics, 1979
- Elected a Foreign Member of the Royal Society in 1981
- Elected to American Philosophical Society, 1982
- James Madison Medal of Princeton University, 1991
- National Medal of Science, 1991
- President of the Philosophical Society of Texas, 1992
- Emperor Has No Clothes Award by the Freedom From Religion Foundation, 1999
- Lewis Thomas Prize for Writing about Science, 1999
- Humanist of the Year, American Humanist Association, 2002
- Benjamin Franklin Medal for Distinguished Achievement in the Sciences, American Philosophical Society, 2004
- James Joyce Award, University College Dublin, 2009
- Breakthrough Prize, 2020

== Tributes ==
Weinberg is frequently listed among the scientists with the highest research effect indices, such as the h-index and a "creativity index". The theoretical physicist Peter Woit called Weinberg "arguably the dominant figure in theoretical particle physics during its period of great success from the late sixties to the early eighties" and his contribution to electroweak unification "to this day at the center of the Standard Model, our best understanding of fundamental physics". Tom Siegfried of Science News named Weinberg one of the leading physicists of the era, writing, "Among his peers, Weinberg was one of the most respected figures in all of physics or perhaps all of science". John Preskill called him "one of the most accomplished scientists of our age, and a particularly eloquent spokesperson for the scientific worldview". Brian Greene said Weinberg had an "astounding ability to see into the deep workings of nature" that "profoundly shaped our understanding of the universe". Upon the awarding of the Breakthrough Prize in 2020, string theorist Juan Maldacena, the chair of the selection committee, said, "Steven Weinberg has developed many of the key theoretical tools that we use for the description of nature at a fundamental level".

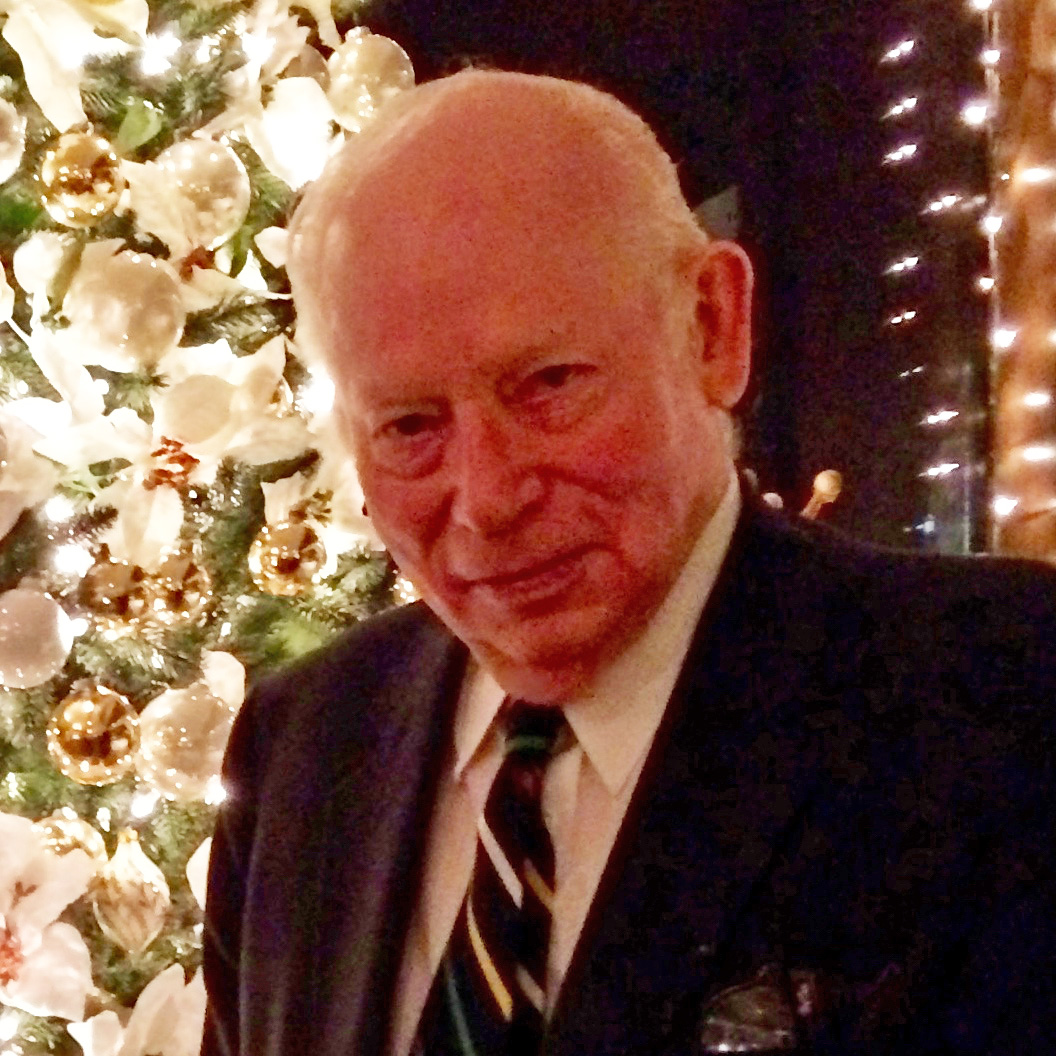
Steven Weinberg in December 2014

== Selected publications ==
A list of Weinberg's publications can be found on arXiv and Scopus. A full list of his publications can be found on inspire-hep and NASA ADS.

=== Textbooks ===
- Gravitation and Cosmology: Principles and Applications of the General Theory of Relativity (1972)
- The Quantum Theory of Fields (Volume I Foundations 1995, Volume II Modern Applications 1996, Volume III Supersymmetry 2000, Cambridge University Press, ISBN 0-521-67053-5, ISBN 0-521-67054-3, ISBN 0-521-66000-9)
- Cosmology (2008, OUP)
- Lectures on Quantum Mechanics (2013, second edition 2015, CUP)
- Lectures on Astrophysics (2019, CUP, ISBN 978-1-108-41507-1)
- Foundations of Modern Physics (2021, CUP, ISBN 978-1-108-84176-4)

=== Popular science ===
- The First Three Minutes: A Modern View of the Origin of the Universe (1977, updated with new afterword in 1993, ISBN 0-465-02437-8)
- The Discovery of Subatomic Particles (1983)
- Elementary Particles and the Laws of Physics: The 1986 Dirac Memorial Lectures (1987; with Richard Feynman)
- Dreams of a Final Theory: The Search for the Fundamental Laws of Nature (1993), ISBN 0-09-922391-0

Ian McEwan included Dreams of a Final Theory in his canon of science writing: "With a fine sense of literary tradition, the physicist Steven Weinberg ... revisited Huxley's lecture on chalk in order to make the case for reductionism." Weinberg recalled: "I found myself so often defending the reductionist aims of high-energy physics that I wrote a book about it, Dreams of a Final Theory. Alas, funding for the Super Collider was cancelled in 1993, but even though I grieve that we physicists had failed to convince Congress, I'm at least proud that my book made it into McEwan's canon."

The chapter "Beautiful Theories" was reprinted as one of the Albert Einstein Memorial lectures.

- To Explain the World: The Discovery of Modern Science (2015)

=== Collected essays ===
- Facing Up: Science and Its Cultural Adversaries (2001, 2003, Harvard University Press)
- Glory and Terror: The Growing Nuclear Danger (2004, The New York Review of Books)
- Lake Views: This World and the Universe
- Third Thoughts (2018, The Belknap Press of Harvard University Press, ISBN 978-0-674-97532-3)

=== Scholarly articles ===
- Weinberg, Steven (November 20, 1967). "A Model of Leptons". Physical Review Letters. 19 (21). American Physical Society (APS): 1264–1266. Bibcode:1967PhRvL..19.1264W. doi:10.1103/physrevlett.19.1264. ISSN 0031-9007.
- Feinberg, G.; Weinberg, S. (April 1, 1961). "Law of Conservation of Muons". Physical Review Letters. 6 (7). American Physical Society (APS): 381–383. Bibcode:1961PhRvL...6..381F. doi:10.1103/physrevlett.6.381. ISSN 0031-9007.
- Pais, Abraham; Weinberg, Steven; Quigg, Chris; Riordan, Michael; Panofsky, Wolfgang K.H.; Trimble, Virginia (April 1, 1997). 100 years of elementary particles [Beam Line, vol. 27, issue 1, Spring 1997] (Report). Office of Scientific and Technical Information (OSTI). doi:10.2172/790903.
- Weinberg, S (2010). "Pions in Large N Quantum Chromodynamics". Phys. Rev. Lett. 105 (26) 261601. arXiv:1009.1537. Bibcode:2010PhRvL.105z1601W. doi:10.1103/PhysRevLett.105.261601. PMID 21231642. S2CID 46210811.
- Weinberg, S (2012). "Collapse of the State Vector". Phys. Rev. A. 85 (6) 062116. arXiv:1109.6462. Bibcode:2012PhRvA..85f2116W. doi:10.1103/physreva.85.062116. S2CID 119273840.

=== Popular articles ===
- A Designer Universe?, a refutation of attacks on the theories of evolution and cosmology, e.g., those conducted under the rubric of intelligent design, is based on a talk given in April 1999 at the Conference on Cosmic Design of the American Association for the Advancement of Science in Washington, D.C. This and other works express Weinberg's strongly held position that scientists should be less passive in defending science against anti-science religiosity.
- The Crisis of Big Science, The New York Review of Books, May 10, 2012. Weinberg places the cancellation of the Superconducting Super Collider in the context of a bigger national and global socio-economic crisis, including a general crisis in funding for science research and the provision of adequate education, healthcare, transportation, and communication infrastructure, and criminal justice and law enforcement.
- Steven Weinberg: the 13 best science books for the general reader The Nobel laureate on making science accessible – from Ptolemy to Darwin to Dawkins.

=== Autobiography ===
At the time of Weinberg's death, he was working on his memoirs. His widow had the unfinished part, covering the 20th century, published as Steven Weinberg: A Life in Physics.

== See also ==
- List of Jewish Nobel laureates
