= Effective field theory =

Type of approximation to an underlying physical theory

In physics, an effective field theory is a type of approximation, or effective theory, for an underlying physical theory, such as a quantum field theory or a statistical mechanics model. An effective field theory includes the appropriate degrees of freedom to describe physical phenomena occurring at a chosen length scale or energy scale, while ignoring substructure and degrees of freedom at shorter distances (or, equivalently, at higher energies).

Intuitively, one averages over the behavior of the underlying theory at shorter length scales to derive what is hoped to be a simplified model at longer length scales. Effective field theories typically work best when there is a large separation between length scale of interest and the length scale of the underlying dynamics. Effective field theories have found use in particle physics, statistical mechanics, condensed matter physics, general relativity, and hydrodynamics. They simplify calculations, and allow treatment of dissipation and radiation effects.

== Renormalization group ==
Presently, effective field theories are discussed in the context of the renormalization group (RG) where the process of integrating out short distance degrees of freedom is made systematic.

Although this method is not sufficiently concrete to allow the actual construction of effective field theories, the gross understanding of their usefulness becomes clear through an RG analysis. This method also lends credence to the main technique of constructing effective field theories, through the analysis of symmetries. If there is a single energy scale $M$ in the microscopic theory, then the effective field theory can be seen as an expansion in $1/M$. The construction of an effective field theory accurate to some power of $1/M$ requires a new set of free parameters at each order of the expansion in $1/M$.

This technique is useful for scattering or other processes where the maximum momentum scale $\mathbf k$ satisfies the condition $|\mathbf{k}|/M\ll 1$. Since effective field theories are not valid at small length scales, they need not be renormalizable. Indeed, the ever expanding number of parameters at each order in $1/M$ required for an effective field theory means that they are generally not renormalizable in the same sense as quantum electrodynamics which requires only the renormalization of two parameters (the fine structure constant and the electron mass).

== Folk theorem ==
Steven Weinberg's "folk theorem" stipulates how to build an effective field theory that is well behaved. The "theorem" states that the most general Lagrangian that is consistent with the symmetries of the low energy theory can be rendered into an effective field theory at low energies that respects the symmetries and respects unitarity, analyticity, and cluster decomposition.

== Examples ==
=== Fermi theory of beta decay ===
The best-known example of an effective field theory is the Fermi theory of beta decay. This theory was developed during the early study of weak decays of nuclei when only the hadrons and leptons undergoing weak decay were known. The typical reactions studied were:

$$\begin{align}
n & \to p+e^-+\overline\nu_e \\
\mu^- & \to e^-+\overline\nu_e+\nu_\mu.
\end{align}$$

This theory posited a pointlike interaction between the four fermions involved in these reactions. The theory had great phenomenological success and was eventually understood to arise from the gauge theory of electroweak interactions, which forms a part of the Standard Model of particle physics. In this more fundamental theory, the interactions are mediated by a flavour-changing gauge boson, the W^{±}. The immense success of the Fermi theory was because the W particle has mass of about 80 GeV, whereas the early experiments were all done at an energy scale of less than 10 MeV. Such a separation of scales, by over 3 orders of magnitude, has not been met in any other situation as yet.

=== BCS theory of superconductivity ===
Another famous example is the BCS theory of superconductivity. Here, the underlying theory is the theory of electrons in a metal interacting with lattice vibrations called phonons. The phonons cause attractive interactions between some electrons, causing them to form Cooper pairs. The length scale of these pairs is much larger than the wavelength of phonons, making it possible to neglect the dynamics of phonons and construct a theory in which two electrons effectively interact at a point. This theory has had remarkable success in describing and predicting the results of experiments on superconductivity.

=== Gravitational field theories ===
General relativity (GR) itself is expected to be the low energy effective field theory of a full theory of quantum gravity, such as string theory or loop quantum gravity. The expansion scale is the Planck mass. Effective field theories have also been used to simplify problems in general relativity, in particular in calculating the gravitational wave signature of inspiralling finite-sized objects. The most common EFT in GR is non-relativistic general relativity (NRGR), which is similar to the post-Newtonian expansion. Another common GR EFT is the extreme mass ratio (EMR), which in the context of the inspiralling problem is called extreme mass ratio inspiral.

=== Other examples ===
Presently, effective field theories are written for many situations.

- One major branch of nuclear physics is quantum hadrodynamics, where the interactions of hadrons are treated as a field theory, which should be derivable from the underlying theory of quantum chromodynamics (QCD). Quantum hadrodynamics is the theory of the nuclear force, similarly to quantum chromodynamics being the theory of the strong interaction and quantum electrodynamics being the theory of the electromagnetic force. Due to the smaller separation of length scales here, this effective theory has some classificatory power, but not the spectacular success of the Fermi theory.
- In particle physics the effective field theory of QCD called chiral perturbation theory has had better success. This theory deals with the interactions of hadrons with pions or kaons, which are the Goldstone bosons of spontaneous chiral symmetry breaking. The expansion parameter is the pion energy/momentum.
- For hadrons containing one heavy quark (such as the bottom or charm), an effective field theory which expands in powers of the quark mass, called the heavy quark effective theory (HQET), has been found useful.
- For hadrons containing two heavy quarks, an effective field theory which expands in powers of the relative velocity of the heavy quarks, called non-relativistic QCD (NRQCD), has been found useful, especially when used in conjunctions with lattice QCD.
- For hadron reactions with light energetic (collinear) particles, the interactions with low-energetic (soft) degrees of freedom are described by the soft-collinear effective theory (SCET).
- Much of condensed matter physics consists of writing effective field theories for the particular property of matter being studied.
- Dissipationless hydrodynamics can also be treated using effective field theories.

== See also ==
- Form factor (quantum field theory)
- Renormalization group
- Quantum field theory
- Quantum triviality
- Ginzburg–Landau theory

== Books ==
- A.A. Petrov and A. Blechman, Effective Field Theories, Singapore: World Scientific (2016). ISBN 978-981-4434-92-8
- C.P. Burgess, Introduction to Effective Field Theory, Cambridge University Press (2020). ISBN 978-052-1195-47-8
