= Nuclear shell model =

Model of the atomic nucleus

In nuclear physics, atomic physics, and nuclear chemistry, the nuclear shell model provides a qualitatively useful model of atomic nuclei energy levels. The model combines a spherically symmetric, independent particle model with spin-orbit coupling for the nucleon energy levels with the Pauli exclusion principle to fill the levels. The first shell model was proposed by Dmitri Ivanenko (together with E. Gapon) in 1932. The model was developed in 1949 following independent work by Maria Goeppert Mayer and J. Hans D. Jensen, who received the 1963 Nobel Prize in Physics for their contributions to this model, and Eugene Wigner, who received the Nobel Prize alongside them for his earlier foundational work on atomic nuclei. Increasingly accurate models add deformed potentials and nucleon correlation effects.

The nuclear shell model is partly analogous to the atomic shell model, which describes the arrangement of electrons in an atom, in that a filled shell results in better stability. When adding nucleons (protons and neutrons) to a nucleus, there are certain points where the binding energy of the next nucleon is significantly less than the last one. This observation that there are specific magic quantum numbers of nucleons (2, 8, 20, 28, 50, 82, and 126) that are more tightly bound than the following higher number is the origin of the shell model.

The shells for protons and neutrons are independent of each other. Therefore, there can exist both "magic nuclei", in which one nucleon type or the other is at a magic number, and "doubly magic quantum nuclei", where both are. Due to variations in orbital filling, the upper magic numbers are 126 and, speculatively, 184 for neutrons, but only 114 for protons, playing a role in the search for the so-called island of stability. Studies of neutron rich nuclei have suggested 16 may also be a magic number.

To get these numbers, the nuclear shell model starts with an average potential with a shape somewhere between the square well and the harmonic oscillator. To this potential, a spin-orbit term is added. Even so, the total perturbation does not coincide with the experiment, and an empirical spin-orbit coupling must be added with at least two or three different values of its coupling constant, depending on the nuclei being studied.

The empirical proton and neutron shell gaps are numerically obtained from observed binding energies. Distinct shell gaps are shown at labeled magic numbers, and at $N=Z$.

The magic numbers of nuclei, as well as other properties, can be arrived at by approximating the model with a three-dimensional harmonic oscillator plus a spin–orbit interaction. A more realistic but complicated potential is known as the Woods–Saxon potential.

== Independent particle model ==
The starting point for the nuclear shell model is the independent particle model: each nucleon (proton or neutron) is modeled independently, using the quantum mechanics of a single particle, moving in a potential modeling all of the other nucleons. The simplest independent particle model uses a spherically symmetric potential. The model wave function, $\Psi_{n\ell m},$ is then written in a separated form:
$$\Psi_{n\ell m} = R_{n\ell}(r) Y_{\ell}^{m}(\theta, \phi),$$
where the spherical harmonics, $Y_{\ell}^{m},$ are known angular functions and radial term, $R_{n\ell}(r),$ must be computed. The integers n, $\ell$, m are quantum numbers.

Nucleons have spin $1/2$ and this spin angular momentum interacts with the orbital angular momentum represented by quantum number $\ell$. This spin-orbit coupling alters the radial functions and energy levels. The spin and orbital ($\ell$) quantum numbers form composite quantum number j taking values of $j = l \pm 1/2$. The $\ell$ value of states are labeled with spectroscopic notation: $(s, p, d, f, \dots)$ for $\ell = (0, 1, 2, 3, \dots).$.

Computing the radial functions also gives the energy of the states. The radial functions and thus the energy are independent of the $\ell(\ell+1)$ values of the m quantum number. Applying the Pauli exclusion principle, the nuclear shell model assumes that each state is filled in order of the state energy with two nucleons, one for each value of the spin quantum number. The states differing only by m create a shell where steps in energy are constant until all $\ell(\ell+1)$ states are filled.

The nuclear shell model has two sets of levels, one for protons and one for neutrons. The energy for converting a proton into neutron or vice versa is small. Thus the nuclear shell model predicts that the number of protons and neutrons will be similar. If two neutrons are added to a stable element, the resulting isotope will likely decay into an element with fewer neutrons and more protons. This prediction matches the observed line of stable nuclei.

== Modified harmonic oscillator model ==
Consider a three-dimensional harmonic oscillator. This would give, for example, in the first three levels ("ℓ" is the angular momentum quantum number):

| level n | ℓ | m_{ℓ} | m_{s} |
|---|---|---|---|
| 0 | 0 | 0 | +1/2 |
| 0 | 0 | 0 | −1/2 |
| 1 | 1 | +1 | +1/2 |
| 1 | 1 | +1 | −1/2 |
| 1 | 1 | 0 | +1/2 |
| 1 | 1 | 0 | −1/2 |
| 1 | 1 | −1 | +1/2 |
| 1 | 1 | −1 | −1/2 |
| 2 | 0 | 0 | +1/2 |
| 2 | 0 | 0 | −1/2 |
| 2 | 2 | +2 | +1/2 |
| 2 | 2 | +2 | −1/2 |
| 2 | 2 | +1 | +1/2 |
| 2 | 2 | +1 | −1/2 |
| 2 | 2 | 0 | +1/2 |
| 2 | 2 | 0 | −1/2 |
| 2 | 2 | −1 | +1/2 |
| 2 | 2 | −1 | −1/2 |
| 2 | 2 | −2 | +1/2 |
| 2 | 2 | −2 | −1/2 |

Nuclei are built by adding protons and neutrons to these levels. These will always fill the lowest available level, with the first two protons filling level zero, the next six protons filling level one, and so on. As with electrons in the periodic table, protons in the outermost shell will be relatively loosely bound to the nucleus if there are only a few protons in that shell because they are farthest from the center of the nucleus. Therefore, nuclei with a full outer proton shell will have a higher nuclear binding energy than other nuclei with a similar total number of protons. The same is true for neutrons.

This means that the magic numbers are expected to be those in which all occupied shells are full. In accordance with the experiment, we get 2 (level 0 full) and 8 (levels 0 and 1 full) for the first two numbers. However, the full set of magic numbers does not turn out correctly. These can be computed as follows:

- In a three-dimensional harmonic oscillator the total degeneracy of states at level n is ${(n+1)(n+2)\over 2}$.
- Due to the spin, the degeneracy is doubled and is $(n+1)(n+2)$.
- Thus, the magic numbers would be
  $$\sum_{n=0}^k (n+1)(n+2) = \frac{(k+1)(k+2)(k+3)} 3$$
  for all integer k. This gives the following magic numbers: 2, 8, 20, 40, 70, 112, ..., which agree with experiment only in the first three entries. These numbers are twice the tetrahedral numbers (1, 4, 10, 20, 35, 56, ...) from the Pascal Triangle.

In particular, the first six shells are:

- level 0: 2 states (ℓ = 0) = 2.
- level 1: 6 states (ℓ = 1) = 6.
- level 2: 2 states (ℓ = 0) + 10 states (ℓ = 2) = 12.
- level 3: 6 states (ℓ = 1) + 14 states (ℓ = 3) = 20.
- level 4: 2 states (ℓ = 0) + 10 states (ℓ = 2) + 18 states (ℓ = 4) = 30.
- level 5: 6 states (ℓ = 1) + 14 states (ℓ = 3) + 22 states (ℓ = 5) = 42.

where for every ℓ there are 2ℓ+1 different values of m_{l} and 2 values of m_{s}, giving a total of 4ℓ+2 states for every specific level.

These numbers are twice the values of triangular numbers from the Pascal Triangle: 1, 3, 6, 10, 15, 21, ....

=== Including a spin-orbit interaction ===
We next include a spin–orbit interaction. First, we have to describe the system by the quantum numbers j, m_{j} and parity instead of ℓ, m_{l} and m_{s}, as in the hydrogen–like atom. Since every even level includes only even values of ℓ, it includes only states of even (positive) parity. Similarly, every odd level includes only states of odd (negative) parity. Thus we can ignore parity in counting states. The first six shells, described by the new quantum numbers, are

- level 0 (n = 0): 2 states (j = 1/2). Even parity.
- level 1 (n = 1): 2 states (j = 1/2) + 4 states (j = 3/2) = 6. Odd parity.
- level 2 (n = 2): 2 states (j = 1/2) + 4 states (j = 3/2) + 6 states (j = 5/2) = 12. Even parity.
- level 3 (n = 3): 2 states (j = 1/2) + 4 states (j = 3/2) + 6 states (j = 5/2) + 8 states (j = 7/2) = 20. Odd parity.
- level 4 (n = 4): 2 states (j = 1/2) + 4 states (j = 3/2) + 6 states (j = 5/2) + 8 states (j = 7/2) + 10 states (j = 9/2) = 30. Even parity.
- level 5 (n = 5): 2 states (j = 1/2) + 4 states (j = 3/2) + 6 states (j = 5/2) + 8 states (j = 7/2) + 10 states (j = 9/2) + 12 states (j = 11/2) = 42. Odd parity.

where for every j there are 2j+1 different states from different values of m_{j}.

Due to the spin–orbit interaction, the energies of states of the same level but with different j will no longer be identical. This is because in the original quantum numbers, when $\scriptstyle \vec{s}$ is parallel to $\scriptstyle \vec{l}$, the interaction energy is positive, and in this case j = ℓ + s = ℓ + 1/2. When $\scriptstyle \vec{s}$ is anti-parallel to $\scriptstyle \vec{l}$ (i.e. aligned oppositely), the interaction energy is negative, and in this case j=ℓ−s=ℓ−1/2. Furthermore, the strength of the interaction is roughly proportional to ℓ.

For example, consider the states at level 4:

- The 10 states with j = 9/2 come from ℓ = 4 and s parallel to ℓ. Thus they have a positive spin–orbit interaction energy.
- The 8 states with j = 7/2 came from ℓ = 4 and s anti-parallel to ℓ. Thus they have a negative spin–orbit interaction energy.
- The 6 states with j = 5/2 came from ℓ = 2 and s parallel to ℓ. Thus they have a positive spin–orbit interaction energy. However, its magnitude is half compared to the states with j = 9/2.
- The 4 states with j = 3/2 came from ℓ = 2 and s anti-parallel to ℓ. Thus they have a negative spin–orbit interaction energy. However, its magnitude is half compared to the states with j = 7/2.
- The 2 states with j = 1/2 came from ℓ = 0 and thus have zero spin–orbit interaction energy.

=== Changing the profile of the potential ===
The harmonic oscillator potential $V(r) = \mu \omega^2 r^2 /2$ grows infinitely as the distance from the center r goes to infinity. A more realistic potential, such as the Woods–Saxon potential, would approach a constant at this limit. One main consequence is that the average radius of nucleons' orbits would be larger in a realistic potential. This leads to a reduced term $\scriptstyle \hbar^2 l(l+1)/ 2m r^2$ in the Laplace operator of the Hamiltonian operator. Another main difference is that orbits with high average radii, such as those with high n or high ℓ, will have a lower energy than in a harmonic oscillator potential. Both effects lead to a reduction in the energy levels of high ℓ orbits.

=== Magic numbers ===
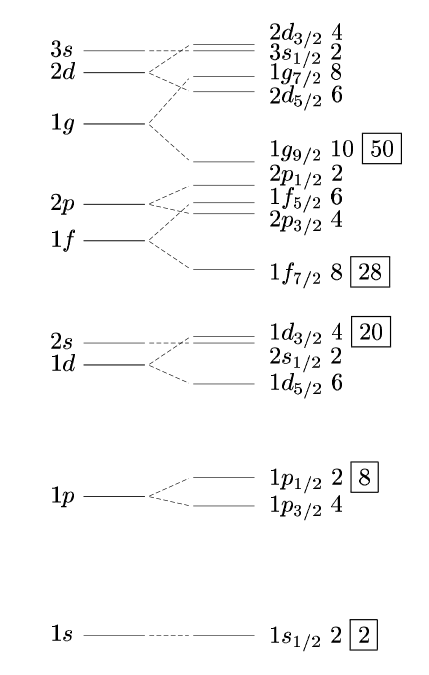
Low-lying energy levels in a single-particle shell model with an oscillator potential (with a small negative l^{2} term) without spin–orbit (left) and with spin–orbit (right) interaction. The number to the right of a level indicates its degeneracy, (2j+1). The boxed integers indicate the magic numbers.

Together with the spin–orbit interaction, and for appropriate magnitudes of both effects, one is led to the following qualitative picture: at all levels, the highest j states have their energies shifted downwards, especially for high n (where the highest j is high). This is both due to the negative spin–orbit interaction energy and to the reduction in energy resulting from deforming the potential into a more realistic one. The second-to-highest j states, on the contrary, have their energy shifted up by the first effect and down by the second effect, leading to a small overall shift. The shifts in the energy of the highest j states can thus bring the energy of states of one level closer to the energy of states of a lower level. The "shells" of the shell model are then no longer identical to the levels denoted by n, and the magic numbers are changed.

We may then suppose that the highest j states for n = 3 have an intermediate energy between the average energies of n = 2 and n = 3, and suppose that the highest j states for larger n (at least up to n = 7) have an energy closer to the average energy of n−1. Then we get the following shells (see the figure)

- 1st shell: 2 states (n = 0, j = 1/2).
- 2nd shell: 6 states (n = 1, j = 1/2 or 3/2).
- 3rd shell: 12 states (n = 2, j = 1/2, 3/2 or 5/2).
- 4th shell: 8 states (n = 3, j = 7/2).
- 5th shell: 22 states (n = 3, j = 1/2, 3/2 or 5/2; n = 4, j = 9/2).
- 6th shell: 32 states (n = 4, j = 1/2, 3/2, 5/2 or 7/2; n = 5, j = 11/2).
- 7th shell: 44 states (n = 5, j = 1/2, 3/2, 5/2, 7/2 or 9/2; n = 6, j = 13/2).
- 8th shell: 58 states (n = 6, j = 1/2, 3/2, 5/2, 7/2, 9/2 or 11/2; n = 7, j = 15/2).

and so on.

Note that the numbers of states after the 4th shell are doubled triangular numbers plus two. Spin–orbit coupling causes so-called "intruder levels" to drop down from the next higher shell into the structure of the previous shell. The sizes of the intruders are such that the resulting shell sizes are themselves increased to the next higher doubled triangular numbers from those of the harmonic oscillator. For example, 1f2p has 20 nucleons, and spin–orbit coupling adds 1g9/2 (10 nucleons), leading to a new shell with 30 nucleons. 1g2d3s has 30 nucleons, and adding intruder 1h11/2 (12 nucleons) yields a new shell size of 42, and so on.

The magic numbers are then

- 2=2
- 8=2+6
- 20=2+6+12
- 28=2+6+12+8
- 50=2+6+12+8+22
- 82=2+6+12+8+22+32
- 126=2+6+12+8+22+32+44
- 184=2+6+12+8+22+32+44+58

and so on. This gives all the observed magic numbers and also predicts a new one (the so-called island of stability) at the value of 184 (for protons, the magic number 126 has not been observed yet, and more complicated theoretical considerations predict the magic number to be 114 instead).

=== Other properties of nuclei ===
This model also predicts or explains with some success other properties of nuclei, in particular spin and parity of nuclei ground states, and to some extent their excited nuclear states as well. Take ^{17}_{8}O (oxygen-17) as an example: Its nucleus has eight protons filling the first three proton "shells", eight neutrons filling the first three neutron "shells", and one extra neutron. All protons in a complete proton shell have zero total angular momentum, since their angular momenta cancel each other. The same is true for neutrons. All protons in the same level (n) have the same parity (either +1 or −1), and since the parity of a pair of particles is the product of their parities, an even number of protons from the same level (n) will have +1 parity. Thus, the total angular momentum of the eight protons and the first eight neutrons is zero, and their total parity is +1. This means that the spin (i.e. angular momentum) of the nucleus, as well as its parity, are fully determined by that of the ninth neutron. This one is in the first (i.e. lowest energy) state of the 4th shell, which is a d-shell (ℓ = 2), and since p = (−1)^{ℓ}, this gives the nucleus an overall parity of +1. This 4th d-shell has a j = 5/2, thus the nucleus of ^{17}_{8}O is expected to have positive parity and total angular momentum 5/2, which indeed it has.

The rules for the ordering of the nucleus shells are similar to Hund's Rules of the atomic shells, however, unlike its use in atomic physics, the completion of a shell is not signified by reaching the next n, as such the shell model cannot accurately predict the order of excited nuclei states, though it is very successful in predicting the ground states. The order of the first few terms are listed as follows: 1s, 1p3/2, 1p1/2, 1d5/2, 2s, 1d3/2... For further clarification on the notation refer to the article on the Russell–Saunders term symbol.

For nuclei farther from the magic quantum numbers one must add the assumption that due to the relation between the strong nuclear force and total angular momentum, protons or neutrons with the same n tend to form pairs of opposite angular momentum. Therefore, a nucleus with an even number of protons and an even number of neutrons has 0 spin and positive parity. A nucleus with an even number of protons and an odd number of neutrons (or vice versa) has the parity of the last neutron (or proton), and the spin equal to the total angular momentum of this neutron (or proton). By "last" we mean the properties coming from the highest energy level.

In the case of a nucleus with an odd number of protons and an odd number of neutrons, one must consider the total angular momentum and parity of both the last neutron and the last proton. The nucleus parity will be a product of theirs, while the nucleus spin will be one of the possible results of the sum of their angular momenta (with other possible results being excited states of the nucleus).

The ordering of angular momentum levels within each shell is according to the principles described above – due to spin–orbit interaction, with high angular momentum states having their energies shifted downwards due to the deformation of the potential (i.e. moving from a harmonic oscillator potential to a more realistic one). For nucleon pairs, however, it is often energetically favourable to be at high angular momentum, even if its energy level for a single nucleon would be higher. This is due to the relation between angular momentum and the strong nuclear force.

The nuclear magnetic moment of neutrons and protons is partly predicted by this simple version of the shell model. The magnetic moment is calculated through j, ℓ and s of the "last" nucleon, but nuclei are not in states of well-defined ℓ and s. Furthermore, for odd-odd nuclei, one has to consider the two "last" nucleons, as in deuterium. Therefore, one gets several possible answers for the nuclear magnetic moment, one for each possible combined ℓ and s state, and the real state of the nucleus is a superposition of them. Thus the real (measured) nuclear magnetic moment is somewhere in between the possible answers.

The electric dipole of a nucleus is always zero, because its ground state has a definite parity. The matter density (ψ^{2}, where ψ is the wavefunction) is always invariant under parity. This is usually the situation with the atomic electric dipole.

Higher electric and magnetic multipole moments cannot be predicted by this simple version of the shell model for reasons similar to those in the case of deuterium.

== Including residual interactions ==
Residual interactions among valence nucleons are included by diagonalizing an effective Hamiltonian in a valence space outside an inert core. As indicated, only single-particle states lying in the valence space are active in the basis used.

For nuclei having two or more valence nucleons (i.e. nucleons outside a closed shell), a residual two-body interaction must be added. This residual term comes from the part of the inter-nucleon interaction not included in the approximative average potential. Through this inclusion, different shell configurations are mixed, and the energy degeneracy of states corresponding to the same configuration is broken.

These residual interactions are incorporated through shell model calculations in a truncated model space (or valence space). This space is spanned by a basis of many-particle states where only single-particle states in the model space are active. The Schrödinger equation is solved on this basis, using an effective Hamiltonian specifically suited for the model space. This Hamiltonian is different from the one of free nucleons as, among other things, it has to compensate for excluded configurations.

One can do away with the average potential approximation entirely by extending the model space to the previously inert core and treating all single-particle states up to the model space truncation as active. This forms the basis of the no-core shell model, which is an ab initio method. It is necessary to include a three-body interaction in such calculations to achieve agreement with experiments.

== Collective rotation and the deformed potential ==
In 1953 the first experimental examples were found of rotational bands in nuclei, with their energy levels following the same J(J+1) pattern of energies as in rotating molecules. Quantum mechanically, it is impossible to have a collective rotation of a sphere, so this implied that the shape of these nuclei was non-spherical. In principle, these rotational states could have been described as coherent superpositions of particle-hole excitations in the basis consisting of single-particle states of the spherical potential. But in reality, the description of these states in this manner is intractable, due to a large number of valence particles—and this intractability was even greater in the 1950s when computing power was extremely rudimentary. For these reasons, Aage Bohr, Ben Mottelson, and Sven Gösta Nilsson constructed models in which the potential was deformed into an ellipsoidal shape. The first successful model of this type is now known as the Nilsson model. It is essentially the harmonic oscillator model described in this article, but with anisotropy added, so the oscillator frequencies along the three Cartesian axes are not all the same. Typically the shape is a prolate ellipsoid, with the axis of symmetry taken to be z. Because the potential is not spherically symmetric, the single-particle states are not states of good angular momentum J. However, a Lagrange multiplier $-\omega\cdot J$, known as a "cranking" term, can be added to the Hamiltonian. Usually the angular frequency vector ω is taken to be perpendicular to the symmetry axis, although tilted-axis cranking can also be considered. Filling the single-particle states up to the Fermi level produces states whose expected angular momentum along the cranking axis $\langle J_x\rangle$ is the desired value.

== Related models ==
Igal Talmi developed a method to obtain the information from experimental data and use it to calculate and predict energies which have not been measured. This method has been successfully used by many nuclear physicists and has led to a deeper understanding of nuclear structure. The theory which gives a good description of these properties was developed. This description turned out to furnish the shell model basis of the elegant and successful interacting boson model.

A model derived from the nuclear shell model is the alpha particle model developed by Henry Margenau, Edward Teller, J. K. Pering, T. H. Skyrme, also sometimes called the Skyrme model. Note, however, that the Skyrme model is usually taken to be a model of the nucleon itself, as a "cloud" of mesons (pions), rather than as a model of the nucleus as a "cloud" of alpha particles.

== See also ==
- Nuclear structure
- Table of nuclides
- Semi-empirical mass formula
- Isomeric shift
- Interacting boson model
