= Nilsson model =

Nuclear shell model

The Nilsson model is a nuclear shell model treating the atomic nucleus as a deformed sphere. In 1953, the first experimental examples were found of rotational bands in nuclei, with their energy levels following the same J(J+1) pattern of energies as in rotating molecules. Quantum mechanically, it is impossible to have a collective rotation of a sphere, so this implied that the shape of these nuclei was nonspherical. In principle, these rotational states could have been described as coherent superpositions of particle-hole excitations in the basis consisting of single-particle states of the spherical potential. But in reality, the description of these states in this manner is intractable, due to the large number of valence particles—and this intractability was even greater in the 1950s, when computing power was extremely rudimentary. For these reasons, Aage Bohr, Ben Mottelson, and Sven Gösta Nilsson constructed models in which the potential was deformed into an ellipsoidal shape. The first successful model of this type is the one now known as the Nilsson model. It is essentially a nuclear shell model using a harmonic oscillator potential, but with anisotropy added, so that the oscillator frequencies along the three Cartesian axes are not all the same. Typically the shape is a prolate ellipsoid, with the axis of symmetry taken to be z.

== Hamiltonian ==
For an axially symmetric shape with the axis of symmetry being the z axis, the Hamiltonian is

$H=\frac{1}{2}m\omega_z^2 z^2+\frac{1}{2}m\omega_\perp^2 (x^2+y^2)-c_1\ell\cdot s-c_2(\ell^2-\langle\ell^2\rangle_N).$

Here m is the mass of the nucleon, N is the total number of harmonic oscillator quanta in the spherical basis, $\ell$ is the orbital angular momentum operator, $\ell^2$ is its square (with eigenvalues $\ell(\ell+1)$), $\langle\ell^2\rangle_N=(1/2)N(N+3)$ is the average value of $\ell^2$ over the N shell, and s is the intrinsic spin.

The anisotropy of the potential is such that the length of an equipotential along the z is greater than the length on the transverse axes in the ratio $\omega_\perp/\omega_z$. This is conventionally expressed in terms of a deformation parameter δ so that the harmonic oscillator part of the potential can be written as the sum of a spherically symmetric harmonic oscillator and a term proportional to δ. Positive values of δ indicate prolate deformations, like an American football. Most nuclei in their ground states have equilibrium shapes such that δ ranges from 0 to 0.2, while superdeformed states have $\delta\approx 0.5$ (a 2-to-1 axis ratio).

The mathematical details of the deformation parameters are as follows. Considering the success of the nuclear liquid drop model, in which the nucleus is taken to be an incompressible fluid, the harmonic oscillator frequencies are constrained so that $\omega_z\omega_\perp^2=\omega_0^3$ remains constant with deformation, preserving the volume of equipotential surfaces. Reproducing the observed density of nuclear matter requires $\hbar\omega_0\approx (42\ \text{MeV})A^{-1/3}$, where A is the mass number. The relation between δ and the anisotropy is $(\omega_\perp/\omega_z)^2=(1+\frac{2}{3}\delta)/(1-\frac{4}{3}\delta)$, while the relation between δ and the axis ratio $R=\omega_\perp/\omega_z$ is $\delta=(3/2)(R^2-1)/(2R^2+1)$.

The remaining two terms in the Hamiltonian do not relate to deformation and are present in the spherical shell model as well. The spin-orbit term represents the spin-orbit dependence of the strong nuclear force; it is much larger than, and has the opposite sign compared to, the special-relativistic spin-orbit splitting. The purpose of the $\ell^2$ term is to mock up the flat profile of the nuclear potential as a function of radius. For nuclear wavefunctions (unlike atomic wavefunctions) states with high angular momentum have their probability density concentrated at greater radii. The term $-\langle\ell^2\rangle_N$ prevents this from shifting a major shell up or down as a whole. The two adjustable constants are conventionally parametrized as $c_1=2\kappa\hbar\omega_0$ and $c_2=\mu\kappa\hbar\omega_0$. Typical values of κ and μ for heavy nuclei are 0.06 and 0.5. With this parametrization, $\hbar\omega_0$ occurs as a simple scaling factor throughout all the calculations.

== Choice of basis and quantum numbers ==
For ease of computation using the computational resources of the 1950s, Nilsson used a basis consisting of eigenstates of the spherical hamiltonian. The Nilsson quantum numbers are $\{N,\ell,m_\ell,m_s\}$. The difference between the spherical and deformed Hamiltonian is proportional to $r^2Y_{20}\delta$, and this has matrix elements that are easy to calculate in this basis. They couple the different N shells. Eigenstates of the deformed Hamiltonian have good parity (corresponding to even or odd N) and Ω, the projection of the total angular momentum along the symmetry axis. In the absence of a cranking term (see below), time-reversal symmetry causes states with opposite signs of Ω to be degenerate, so that in the calculations only positive values of Ω need to be considered.

== Interpretation ==
In an odd, well-deformed nucleus, the single-particle levels are filled up to the Fermi level, and the odd particle's Ω and parity give the spin and parity of the ground state.

== Cranking ==
Because the potential is not spherically symmetric, the single-particle states are not states of good angular momentum J. However, a Lagrange multiplier $-\omega\cdot J$, known as a "cranking" term, can be added to the Hamiltonian. Usually the angular frequency vector ω is taken to be perpendicular to the symmetry axis, although tilted-axis cranking can also be considered. Filling the single-particle states up to the Fermi level then produces states whose expected angular momentum along the cranking axis $\langle J_x\rangle$ has the desired value set by the Lagrange multiplier.

== Total energy ==
Often one wants to calculate a total energy as a function of deformation. Minima of this function are predicted equilibrium shapes. Adding the single-particle energies does not work for this purpose, partly because kinetic and potential terms are out of proportion by a factor of two, and partly because small errors in the energies accumulate in the sum. For this reason, such sums are usually renormalized using a procedure introduced by Strutinsky.

Energy levels for light nuclei.

Energy levels for medium-weight nuclei.

== Plots of energy levels ==
Single-particle levels can be shown in a "spaghetti plot," as functions of the deformation. A large gap between energy levels at zero deformation indicates a particle number at which there is a shell closure: the traditional "magic numbers." Any such gap, at a zero or nonzero deformation, indicates that when the Fermi level is at that height, the nucleus will be stable relative to the liquid drop model.
