= Molar ionization energies of the elements =

Table of molar ionization energies for the chemical elements

These tables list values of molar ionization energies, measured in kJ⋅mol^{−1}. This is the energy per mole necessary to remove electrons from gaseous atoms or atomic ions. The first molar ionization energy applies to the neutral atoms. The second, third, etc., molar ionization energy applies to the further removal of an electron from a singly, doubly, etc., charged ion. For ionization energies measured in the unit eV, see Ionization energies of the elements (data page). All data from rutherfordium onwards is predicted.

== 1st–10th ionization energies ==
Number	Symbol	Name	1st	2nd	3rd	4th	5th	6th	7th	8th	9th	10th
1	H	hydrogen	1312.0									
2	He	helium	2372.3	5250.5								
3	Li	lithium	520.2	7298.1	11,815.0							
4	Be	beryllium	899.5	1757.1	14,848.7	21,006.6						
5	B	boron	800.6	2427.1	3659.7	25,025.8	32,826.7					
6	C	carbon	1086.5	2352.6	4620.5	6222.7	37,831	47,277.0				
7	N	nitrogen	1402.3	2856	4578.1	7475.0	9444.9	53,266.6	64,360			
8	O	oxygen	1313.9	3388.3	5300.5	7469.2	10,989.5	13,326.5	71,330	84,078.0		
9	F	fluorine	1681.0	3374.2	6050.4	8407.7	11,022.7	15,164.1	17,868	92,038.1	106,434.3	
10	Ne	neon	2080.7	3952.3	6122	9371	12,177	15,238.90	19,999.0	23,069.5	115,379.5	131,432
11	Na	sodium	495.8	4562	6910.3	9543	13,354	16,613	20,117	25,496	28,932	141,362
12	Mg	magnesium	737.7	1450.7	7732.7	10,542.5	13,630	18,020	21,711	25,661	31,653	35,458
13	Al	aluminium	577.5	1816.7	2744.8	11,577	14,842	18,379	23,326	27,465	31,853	38,473
14	Si	silicon	786.5	1577.1	3231.6	4355.5	16,091	19,805	23,780	29,287	33,878	38,726
15	P	phosphorus	1011.8	1907	2914.1	4963.6	6273.9	21,267	25,431	29,872	35,905	40,950
16	S	sulfur	999.6	2252	3357	4556	7004.3	8495.8	27,107	31,719	36,621	43,177
17	Cl	chlorine	1251.2	2298	3822	5158.6	6542	9362	11,018	33,604	38,600	43,961
18	Ar	argon	1520.6	2665.8	3931	5771	7238	8781	11,995	13,842	40,760	46,186
19	K	potassium	418.8	3052	4420	5877	7975	9590	11,343	14,944	16,963.7	48,610
20	Ca	calcium	589.8	1145.4	4912.4	6491	8153	10,496	12,270	14,206	18,191	20,385
21	Sc	scandium	633.1	1235.0	2388.6	7090.6	8843	10,679	13,310	15,250	17,370	21,726
22	Ti	titanium	658.8	1309.8	2652.5	4174.6	9581	11,533	13,590	16,440	18,530	20,833
23	V	vanadium	650.9	1414	2830	4507	6298.7	12,363	14,530	16,730	19,860	22,240
24	Cr	chromium	652.9	1590.6	2987	4743	6702	8744.9	15,455	17,820	20,190	23,580
25	Mn	manganese	717.3	1509.0	3248	4940	6990	9220	11,500	18,770	21,400	23,960
26	Fe	iron	762.5	1561.9	2957	5290	7240	9560	12,060	14,580	22,540	25,290
27	Co	cobalt	760.4	1648	3232	4950	7670	9840	12,440	15,230	17,959	26,570
28	Ni	nickel	737.1	1753.0	3395	5300	7339	10,400	12,800	15,600	18,600	21,670
29	Cu	copper	745.5	1957.9	3555	5536	7700	9900	13,400	16,000	19,200	22,400
30	Zn	zinc	906.4	1733.3	3833	5731	7970	10,400	12,900	16,800	19,600	23,000
31	Ga	gallium	578.8	1979.3	2963	6180						
32	Ge	germanium	762	1537.5	3302.1	4411	9020					
33	As	arsenic	947.0	1798	2735	4837	6043	12,310				
34	Se	selenium	941.0	2045	2973.7	4144	6590	7880	14,990			
35	Br	bromine	1139.9	2103	3470	4560	5760	8550	9940	18,600		
36	Kr	krypton	1350.8	2350.4	3565	5070	6240	7570	10,710	12,138	22,274	25,880
37	Rb	rubidium	403.0	2633	3860	5080	6850	8140	9570	13,120	14,500	26,740
38	Sr	strontium	549.5	1064.2	4138	5500	6910	8760	10,230	11,800	15,600	17,100
39	Y	yttrium	600	1180	1980	5847	7430	8970	11,190	12,450	14,110	18,400
40	Zr	zirconium	640.1	1270	2218	3313	7752	9500				
41	Nb	niobium	652.1	1380	2416	3700	4877	9847	12,100			
42	Mo	molybdenum	684.3	1560	2618	4480	5257	6640.8	12,125	13,860	15,835	17,980
43	Tc	technetium	686.9	1470	2850							
44	Ru	ruthenium	710.2	1620	2747							
45	Rh	rhodium	719.7	1740	2997							
46	Pd	palladium	804.4	1870	3177							
47	Ag	silver	731.0	2070	3361	4728						
48	Cd	cadmium	867.8	1631.4	3616							
49	In	indium	558.3	1820.7	2704	5210						
50	Sn	tin	708.6	1411.8	2943.0	3930.3	7456					
51	Sb	antimony	834	1594.9	2440	4260	5400	10,400				
52	Te	tellurium	869.3	1790	2698	3610	5668	6820	13,200			
53	I	iodine	1008.4	1845.9	3180							
54	Xe	xenon	1170.4	2046.4	3099.4							
55	Cs	caesium	375.7	2234.3	3400							
56	Ba	barium	502.9	965.2	3600							
57	La	lanthanum	538.1	1067	1850.3	4819	5940					
58	Ce	cerium	534.4	1050	1949	3547	6325	7490				
59	Pr	praseodymium	527	1020	2086	3761	5551					
60	Nd	neodymium	533.1	1040	2130	3900						
61	Pm	promethium	540	1050	2150	3970						
62	Sm	samarium	544.5	1070	2260	3990						
63	Eu	europium	547.1	1085	2404	4120						
64	Gd	gadolinium	593.4	1170	1990	4250						
65	Tb	terbium	565.8	1110	2114	3839						
66	Dy	dysprosium	573.0	1130	2200	3990						
67	Ho	holmium	581.0	1140	2204	4100						
68	Er	erbium	589.3	1150	2194	4120						
69	Tm	thulium	596.7	1160	2285	4120						
70	Yb	ytterbium	603.4	1174.8	2417	4203						
71	Lu	lutetium	523.5	1340	2022.3	4370	6445					
72	Hf	hafnium	658.5	1440	2250	3216						
73	Ta	tantalum	761	1500								
74	W	tungsten	770	1700								
75	Re	rhenium	760	1260	2510	3640						
76	Os	osmium	840	1600								
77	Ir	iridium	880	1600								
78	Pt	platinum	870	1791								
79	Au	gold	890.1	1980								
80	Hg	mercury	1007.1	1810	3300							
81	Tl	thallium	589.4	1971	2878							
82	Pb	lead	715.6	1450.5	3081.5	4083	6640					
83	Bi	bismuth	703	1610	2466	4370	5400	8520				
84	Po	polonium	812.1									
85	At	astatine	899.003									
86	Rn	radon	1037									
87	Fr	francium	393									
88	Ra	radium	509.3	979.0								
89	Ac	actinium	499	1170	1900	4700						
90	Th	thorium	587	1110	1978	2780						
91	Pa	protactinium	568	1128	1814	2991						
92	U	uranium	597.6	1420	1900	3145						
93	Np	neptunium	604.5	1128	1997	3242						
94	Pu	plutonium	584.7	1128	2084	3338						
95	Am	americium	578	1158	2132	3493						
96	Cm	curium	581	1196	2026	3550						
97	Bk	berkelium	601	1186	2152	3434						
98	Cf	californium	608	1206	2267	3599						
99	Es	einsteinium	619	1216	2334	3734						
100	Fm	fermium	629	1225	2363	3792						
101	Md	mendelevium	636	1235	2470	3840						
102	No	nobelium	639	1254	2643	3956						
103	Lr	lawrencium	479	1428	2228	4910						
104	Rf	rutherfordium	580	1390	2300	3080						
105	Db	dubnium	665	1547	2378	3299	4305					
106	Sg	seaborgium	757	1733	2484	3416	4562	5716				
107	Bh	bohrium	740	1690	2570	3600	4730	5990	7230			
108	Hs	hassium	730	1760	2830	3640	4940	6180	7540	8860		
109	Mt	meitnerium	800	1820	2900	3900	4900					
110	Ds	darmstadtium	960	1890	3030	4000	5100					
111	Rg	roentgenium	1020	2070	3080	4100	5300					
112	Cn	copernicium	1155	2170	3160	4200	5500					
113	Nh	nihonium	707.2	2309	3020	4382	5638					
114	Fl	flerovium	832.2	1600	3370	4400	5850					
115	Mc	moscovium	538.3	1760	2650	4680	5720					
116	Lv	livermorium	663.9	1330	2850	3810	6080					
117	Ts	tennessine	736.9	1435.4	2161.9	4012.9	5076.4					
118	Og	oganesson	860.1	1560								
119	Uue	ununennium	463.1	1700								
120	Ubn	unbinilium	563.3	895– 919								
121	Ubu	unbiunium	429.4	1110	1710	4270						
122	Ubb	unbibium	545	1090	1848	2520						

== 11th–20th ionization energies ==
number	symbol	name	11th	12th	13th	14th	15th	16th	17th	18th	19th	20th
11	Na	sodium	159,076									
12	Mg	magnesium	169,988	189,368								
13	Al	aluminium	42,647	201,266	222,316							
14	Si	silicon	45,962	50,502	235,196	257,923						
15	P	phosphorus	46,261	54,110	59,024	271,791	296,195					
16	S	sulfur	48,710	54,460	62,930	68,216	311,048	337,138				
17	Cl	chlorine	51,068	57,119	63,363	72,341	78,095	352,994	380,760			
18	Ar	argon	52,002	59,653	66,199	72,918	82,473	88,576	397,605	427,066		
19	K	potassium	54,490	60,730	68,950	75,900	83,080	93,400	99,710	444,880	476,063	
20	Ca	calcium	57,110	63,410	70,110	78,890	86,310	94,000	104,900	111,711	494,850	527,762
21	Sc	scandium	24,102	66,320	73,010	80,160	89,490	97,400	105,600	117,000	124,270	547,530
22	Ti	titanium	25,575	28,125	76,015	83,280	90,880	100,700	109,100	117,800	129,900	137,530
23	V	vanadium	24,670	29,730	32,446	86,450	94,170	102,300	112,700	121,600	130,700	143,400
24	Cr	chromium	26,130	28,750	34,230	37,066	97,510	105,800	114,300	125,300	134,700	144,300
25	Mn	manganese	27,590	30,330	33,150	38,880	41,987	109,480	118,100	127,100	138,600	148,500
26	Fe	iron	28,000	31,920	34,830	37,840	44,100	47,206	122,200	131,000	140,500	152,600
27	Co	cobalt	29,400	32,400	36,600	39,700	42,800	49,396	52,737	134,810	145,170	154,700
28	Ni	nickel	30,970	34,000	37,100	41,500	44,800	48,100	55,101	58,570	148,700	159,000
29	Cu	copper	25,600	35,600	38,700	42,000	46,700	50,200	53,700	61,100	64,702	163,700
30	Zn	zinc	26,400	29,990	40,490	43,800	47,300	52,300	55,900	59,700	67,300	71,200
36	Kr	krypton	29,700	33,800	37,700	43,100	47,500	52,200	57,100	61,800	75,800	80,400
38	Sr	strontium	31,270									
39	Y	yttrium	19,900	36,090								
42	Mo	molybdenum	20,190	22,219	26,930	29,196	52,490	55,000	61,400	67,700	74,000	80,400

== 21st–30th ionization energies ==
number	symbol	name	21st	22nd	23rd	24th	25th	26th	27th	28th	29th	30th
21	Sc	scandium	582,163									
22	Ti	titanium	602,930	639,294								
23	V	vanadium	151,440	661,050	699,144							
24	Cr	chromium	157,700	166,090	721,870	761,733						
25	Mn	manganese	158,600	172,500	181,380	785,450	827,067					
26	Fe	iron	163,000	173,600	188,100	195,200	851,800	895,161				
27	Co	cobalt	167,400	178,100	189,300	204,500	214,100	920,870	966,023			
28	Ni	nickel	169,400	182,700	194,000	205,600	221,400	231,490	992,718	1,039,668		
29	Cu	copper	174,100	184,900	198,800	210,500	222,700	239,100	249,660	1,067,358	1,116,105	
30	Zn	zinc	179,100									
36	Kr	krypton	85,300	90,400	96,300	101,400	111,100	116,290	282,500	296,200	311,400	326,200
42	Mo	molybdenum	87,000	93,400	98,420	104,400	121,900	127,700	133,800	139,800	148,100	154,500
