= Separation energy =

Energy needed to remove a specified particle from an atom's nucleus

In nuclear physics, separation energy is the energy needed to remove one nucleon (or other specified particle or particles) from an atomic nucleus.

The separation energy is different for each nuclide and particle to be removed. Values are stated as "neutron separation energy", "two-neutron separation energy", "proton separation energy", "deuteron separation energy", "alpha separation energy", and so on.

The lowest separation energy among stable nuclides is 1.67 MeV, to remove a neutron from beryllium-9.

The energy can be added to the nucleus by an incident high-energy gamma ray. If the energy of the incident photon exceeds the separation energy, a photodisintegration might occur. Energy in excess of the threshold value becomes kinetic energy of the ejected particle.

By contrast, nuclear binding energy is the energy needed to completely disassemble a nucleus, or the energy released when a nucleus is assembled from nucleons. It is the sum of multiple separation energies, which should add to the same total regardless of the order of assembly or disassembly.

== Physics and chemistry ==
Electron separation energy or electron binding energy, the energy required to remove one electron from a neutral atom or molecule (or cation) is called ionization energy. The reaction leads to photoionization, photodissociation, the photoelectric effect, photovoltaics, etc.

Bond-dissociation energy is the energy required to break one bond of a molecule or ion, usually separating an atom or atoms.

== See also ==
- Binding energy
