= Woods–Saxon potential =

Measure of internal forces in an atomic nucleus

Woods–Saxon potential for A = 50, relative to V_{0} with a = 0.5 fm and R=4.6 fm

The Woods–Saxon potential is a mean field potential for the nucleons (protons and neutrons) inside the atomic nucleus, which is used to describe approximately the forces applied to each nucleon, in the nuclear shell model for the structure of the nucleus. The potential is a logistic function with midpoint equal to the nuclear radius and scaling factor interpreted as a "surface thickness". The potential is named after Roger D. Woods and David S. Saxon for their work in 1954.

The form of the potential, in terms of the distance r from the center of nucleus, is:

$V(r) = -\frac{V_0}{1+\exp({r-R\over a})}$

where V_{0} (having dimension of energy) represents the potential well depth, the scaling factor a is a length representing the "surface thickness" of the nucleus, and $R = r_0 A^{1/3}$ is the nuclear radius where r_{0} = 1.25 fm and A is the mass number. Note that $V(R)/V_0 = -1/2$ so that the midpoint of the potential is at the nuclear radius.

Typical values for the parameters are: V_{0} ≈ 50 MeV, a ≈ 0.5 fm.

There are numerous optimized parameter sets available for different atomic nuclei.

For large atomic number A this potential is similar to a potential well. It has the following desired properties

- It is monotonically increasing with distance, i.e. attracting.
- For large A, it is approximately flat in the center.
- Nucleons near the surface of the nucleus (i.e. having r ≈ R within a distance of order a) experience a large force towards the center.
- It rapidly approaches zero as r goes to infinity (r − R >> a), reflecting the short-distance nature of the strong nuclear force.

The Schrödinger equation of this potential can be solved analytically, by transforming it into a hypergeometric differential equation. The radial part of the wavefunction solution is given by

$u(r)= \frac 1r y^\nu (1-y)^\mu {}_2F_1 (\mu+\nu, \mu+\nu+1; 2\nu+1; y)$

where $y = \dfrac{1}{1+\exp\left(\frac {r-R}{a}\right)}$, $\mu = i\sqrt{\gamma^2-\nu^2}$, $\dfrac{2mE}{\hbar^2}=-\nu^2$, $\nu <0$ and $\dfrac{2mV_0}{\hbar^2}a^2=\gamma^2$. Here ${}_2F_1(a,b;c;z) = \sum_{n=0}^\infty \frac{(a)_n (b)_n}{(c)_n} \frac{z^n}{n!}$ is the hypergeometric function.

It is also possible to analytically solve the eigenvalue problem of the Schrödinger equation with the WS potential plus a finite number of the Dirac delta functions.

It is also possible to give analytic formulas of the Fourier transformation of the Woods-Saxon potential which makes it possible to work in the momentum space as well.

== See also ==
- Finite potential well
- Quantum harmonic oscillator
- Particle in a box
- Yukawa potential
- Nuclear force
- Nuclear structure
- Shell model
