= David S. Saxon =

American physicist and educator

- Born: February 8, 1920; St. Paul, Minnesota, U.S.
- Died: December 8, 2005 (aged 85); Los Angeles, California, U.S.
- Education: Massachusetts Institute of Technology
- Known for: Woods-Saxon potential
- Spouse: Shirley Saxon
- Scientific career
- Fields: Physics
- Workplaces: University of California, Los Angeles, MIT
- Thesis: Problems in Electormagnetic Theory (1944)
- Doctoral advisor: John C. Slater

David S. Saxon (February 8, 1920 – December 8, 2005) was an American physicist and educator who served as the President of the University of California as well as the Chairman of the Board of Trustees of the MIT Corporation, the governing board of the Massachusetts Institute of Technology.

Saxon was born in St. Paul, Minnesota. He attended MIT where he earned a B.S. degree in 1941 and Ph.D. in 1944, both in Physics. He worked in MIT's famed wartime Radiation Laboratory during World War II.

Saxon joined the University of California, Los Angeles in 1947, but was dismissed in 1950 with thirty other faculty members because of their objection to signing an oath of loyalty and declaration that they were not Communist Party members. The California Supreme Court later invalidated this requirement and Saxon returned to UCLA in 1952. While at UCLA, Saxon was a dean, vice chancellor, and executive vice chancellor. He served as the president of University of California between 1975 and 1983.

Saxon joined the board of the MIT Corporation in 1977 and held the office of Chairman between 1983 and 1990.

Saxon was a Fellow of the American Academy of Arts and Sciences and a member of the American Philosophical Society, American Physical Society, and the American Association for the Advancement of Science. The Woods-Saxon potential in nuclear physics is named partly after him.

Saxon was married to his wife, Shirley, for 65 years and had six daughters and six grandchildren.

== Books ==
- David S. Saxon (2012) [1968]. Elementary quantum mechanics. Dover publications. ISBN 978-0486485966.

== Notes ==
Academic offices
Preceded by Charles J. Hitch	President of the University of California; 1975–1983	Succeeded by David P. Gardner
