= Sven Gösta Nilsson =

Swedish physicist

Sven Gösta Nilsson (January 14, 1927, Kristianstad – April 24, 1979, Lund) was a Swedish theoretical physicist at the Lund Institute of Technology.

Nilsson's father was a preacher. As an undergraduate engineering student, he spent a year at Occidental College in California. He obtained a Master of Science in engineering physics at the Royal Institute of Technology in Stockholm. Influenced by Tommy Lauritsen and Torsten Gustafson, Nilsson decided to switch paths from engineering to physics, and in 1950 he was admitted to postgraduate studies in Lund with Gustafson as his supervisor.

After early work with Lauritsen on excited states in ^{6}Li, Nilsson became interested in evidence that heavy nuclei could be deformed into ellipsoidal rather than spherical shapes. Rotational bands had been discovered in 1953, an observation that was incompatible with a spherically symmetric shape.

Nilsson set out to produce a model for the structure of deformed nuclei, building on work by Maria Goeppert-Mayer that had been published in 1950, as well as work by Aage Bohr and Ben Mottelson at the Institute for Theoretical Physics (later the Niels Bohr Institute). His research, in collaboration with Bohr and Mottelson, led to the so-called Nilsson model and a 1955 doctoral thesis, "On some properties of nuclear states." Nilsson's main innovations were the introduction of a method for modeling the flat-bottomed shape of the nuclear potential, as well as formulating a model that made calculations practical, and exploiting the digital computing technology of the day.

Nilsson and Mottelson embarked on a comprehensive program of comparing nuclear properties with the predictions of the deformed shell model. The Nilsson model was successful in explaining the spins and magnetic moments of nuclei far from closed shells, problems which would have been intractable with the spherical shell model. In many cases, a disagreement between theory and experiment led to the discovery that the experimental results had been mistaken.

Sven Gösta Nilsson was involved in the work of CERN's Theoretical Study Division when the group was located in Copenhagen. More than twenty years later, then in Geneva, he spent a sabbatical period at CERN. Starting in 1963, he was a professor of mathematical physics at the two-year-old Lund University of Technology, helping to build its research programs. In 1974 he was elected to membership in the Royal Swedish Academy of Sciences. He was an active environmentalist and frequent author of newspaper articles. Nilsson is buried at Norra kyrkogården in Lund.
