= Ionization energies of the elements (data page) =

List of energies required to remove successive electrons from each atom

== Numerical values ==
For each atom, the column marked 1 is the first ionization energy to oxidize the neutral atom, the column marked 2 is the second ionization energy to remove a second electron from the +1 ion, the column marked 3 is the third ionization energy to remove a third electron from the +2 ion, and so on.

"use" and "WEL" give ionization energy in the unit kJ/mol; "CRC" gives atomic ionization energy in the unit eV.

	1	2	3	4	5	6	7	8	9	10	11	12	13	14	15	16	17	18	19	20	21	22	23	24	25	26	27	28	29	30
1 H hydrogen
use	1312.0																													
WEL	1312.0																													
CRC	13.59844																													
2 He helium
use	2372.3	5250.5																												
WEL	2372.3	5250.5																												
CRC	24.58738	54.41776																												
3 Li lithium
use	520.2	7298.1	11815.0																											
WEL	520.2	7298.1	11815.0																											
CRC	5.39171	75.64009	122.45435																											
4 Be beryllium
use	899.5	1757.1	14848.7	21006.6																										
WEL	899.5	1757.1	14848.7	21006.6																										
CRC	9.32269	18.21115	153.89620	217.71858																										
5 B boron
use	800.6	2427.1	3659.7	25025.8	32826.7																									
WEL	800.6	2427.1	3659.7	25025.8	32826.7																									
CRC	8.29803	25.15484	37.93064	259.37521	340.22580																									
6 C carbon
use	1086.5	2352.6	4620.5	6222.7	37831	47277.0																								
WEL	1086.5	2352.6	4620.5	6222.7	37831	47277.0																								
CRC	11.26030	24.38332	47.8878	64.4939	392.087	489.99334																								
7 N nitrogen
use	1402.3	2856	4578.1	7475.0	9444.9	53266.6	64360																							
WEL	1402.3	2856	4578.1	7475.0	9444.9	53266.6	64360																							
CRC	14.53414	29.6013	47.44924	77.4735	97.8902	552.0718	667.046																							
8 O oxygen
use	1313.9	3388.3	5300.5	7469.2	10989.5	13326.5	71330	84078.0																						
WEL	1313.9	3388.3	5300.5	7469.2	10989.5	13326.5	71330	84078.0																						
CRC	13.61806	35.11730	54.9355	77.41353	113.8990	138.1197	739.29	871.4101																						
9 F fluorine
use	1681.0	3374.2	6050.4	8407.7	11022.7	15164.1	17868	92038.1	106434.3																					
WEL	1681.0	3374.2	6050.4	8407.7	11022.7	15164.1	17868	92038.1	106434.3																					
CRC	17.42282	34.97082	62.7084	87.1398	114.2428	157.1651	185.186	953.9112	1103.1176																					
10 Ne neon
use	2080.7	3952.3	6122	9371	12177	15238	19999.0	23069.5	115379.5	131432																				
WEL	2080.7	3952.3	6122	9371	12177	15238	19999.0	23069.5	115379.5	131432																				
CRC	21.5646	40.96328	63.45	97.12	126.21	157.93	207.2759	239.0989	1195.8286	1362.1995																				
11 Na sodium
use	495.8	4562	6910.3	9543	13354	16613	20117	25496	28932	141362	159076																			
WEL	495.8	4562	6910.3	9543	13354	16613	20117	25496	28932	141362																				
CRC	5.13908	47.2864	71.6200	98.91	138.40	172.18	208.50	264.25	299.864	1465.121	1648.702																			
12 Mg magnesium
use	737.7	1450.7	7732.7	10542.5	13630	18020	21711	25661	31653	35458	169988	189368																		
WEL	737.7	1450.7	7732.7	10542.5	13630	18020	21711	25661	31653	35458																				
CRC	7.64624	15.03528	80.1437	109.2655	141.27	186.76	225.02	265.96	328.06	367.50	1761.805	1962.6650																		
13 Al aluminium
use	577.5	1816.7	2744.8	11577	14842	18379	23326	27465	31853	38473	42647	201266	222316																	
WEL	577.5	1816.7	2744.8	11577	14842	18379	23326	27465	31853	38473																				
CRC	5.98577	18.82856	28.44765	119.992	153.825	190.49	241.76	284.66	330.13	398.75	442.00	2085.98	2304.1410																	
14 Si silicon
use	786.5	1577.1	3231.6	4355.5	16091	19805	23780	29287	33878	38726	45962	50502	235196	257923																
WEL	786.5	1577.1	3231.6	4355.5	16091	19805	23780	29287	33878	38726																				
CRC	8.15169	16.34585	33.49302	45.14181	166.767	205.27	246.5	303.54	351.12	401.37	476.36	523.42	2437.63	2673.182																
15 P phosphorus
use	1011.8	1907	2914.1	4963.6	6273.9	21267	25431	29872	35905	40950	46261	54110	59024	271791	296195															
WEL	1011.8	1907	2914.1	4963.6	6273.9	21267	25431	29872	35905	40950																				
CRC	10.48669	19.7694	30.2027	51.4439	65.0251	220.421	263.57	309.60	372.13	424.4	479.46	560.8	611.74	2816.91	3069.842															
16 S sulfur
use	999.6	2252	3357	4556	7004.3	8495.8	27107	31719	36621	43177	48710	54460	62930	68216	311048	337138														
WEL	999.6	2252	3357	4556	7004.3	8495.8	27107	31719	36621	43177																				
CRC	10.36001	23.3379	34.79	47.222	72.5945	88.0530	280.948	328.75	379.55	447.5	504.8	564.44	652.2	707.01	3223.78	3494.1892														
17 Cl chlorine
use	1251.2	2298	3822	5158.6	6542	9362	11018	33604	38600	43961	51068	57119	63363	72341	78095	352994	380760													
WEL	1251.2	2298	3822	5158.6	6542	9362	11018	33604	38600	43961																				
CRC	12.96764	23.814	39.61	53.4652	67.8	97.03	114.1958	348.28	400.06	455.63	529.28	591.99	656.71	749.76	809.40	3658.521	3946.2960													
18 Ar argon
use	1520.6	2665.8	3931	5771	7238	8781	11995	13842	40760	46186	52002	59653	66199	72918	82473	88576	397605	427066												
WEL	1520.6	2665.8	3931	5771	7238	8781	11995	13842	40760	46186																				
CRC	15.75962	27.62967	40.74	59.81	75.02	91.009	124.323	143.460	422.45	478.69	538.96	618.26	686.10	755.74	854.77	918.03	4120.8857	4426.2296												
19 K potassium
use	418.8	3052	4420	5877	7975	9590	11343	14944	16963.7	48610	54490	60730	68950	75900	83080	93400	99710	444880	476063											
WEL	418.8	3052	4420	5877	7975	9590	11343	14944	16963.7	48610																				
CRC	4.34066	31.63	45.806	60.91	82.66	99.4	117.56	154.88	175.8174	503.8	564.7	629.4	714.6	786.6	861.1	968	1033.4	4610.8	4934.046											
20 Ca calcium
use	589.8	1145.4	4912.4	6491	8153	10496	12270	14206	18191	20385	57110	63410	70110	78890	86310	94000	104900	111711	494850	527762										
WEL	589.8	1145.4	4912.4	6491	8153	10496	12270	14206	18191	20385	57110																			
CRC	6.11316	11.87172	50.9131	67.27	84.50	108.78	127.2	147.24	188.54	211.275	591.9	657.2	726.6	817.6	894.5	974	1087	1157.8	5128.8	5469.864										
21 Sc scandium
use	633.1	1235.0	2388.6	7090.6	8843	10679	13310	15250	17370	21726	24102	66320	73010	80160	89490	97400	105600	117000	124270	547530	582163									
WEL	633.1	1235.0	2388.6	7090.6	8843	10679	13310	15250	17370	21726	24102	66320	73010	80160	89490	97400	105600	117000	124270	547530	582163									
CRC	6.5615	12.79967	24.75666	73.4894	91.65	110.68	138.0	158.1	180.03	225.18	249.798	687.36	756.7	830.8	927.5	1009	1094	1213	1287.97	5674.8	6033.712									
22 Ti titanium
use	658.8	1309.8	2652.5	4174.6	9581	11533	13590	16440	18530	20833	25575	28125	76015	83280	90880	100700	109100	117800	129900	137530	602930	639294								
WEL	658.8	1309.8	2652.5	4174.6	9581	11533	13590	16440	18530	20833	25575	28125	76015	83280	90880	100700	109100	117800	129900	137530	602930									
CRC	6.8281	13.5755	27.4917	43.2672	99.30	119.53	140.8	170.4	192.1	215.92	265.07	291.500	787.84	863.1	941.9	1044	1131	1221	1346	1425.4	6249.0	6625.82								
23 V vanadium
use	650.9	1414	2830	4507	6298.7	12363	14530	16730	19860	22240	24670	29730	32446	86450	94170	102300	112700	121600	130700	143400	151440	661050	699144							
WEL	650.9	1414	2830	4507	6298.7	12363	14530	16730	19860	22240	24670	29730	32446	86450	94170	102300	112700	121600	130700	143400	151440									
CRC	6.7462	14.66	29.311	46.709	65.2817	128.13	150.6	173.4	205.8	230.5	255.7	308.1	336.277	896.0	976	1060	1168	1260	1355	1486	1569.6	6851.3	7246.12							
24 Cr chromium
use	652.9	1590.6	2987	4743	6702	8744.9	15455	17820	20190	23580	26130	28750	34230	37066	97510	105800	114300	125300	134700	144300	157700	166090	721870	761733						
WEL	652.9	1590.6	2987	4743	6702	8744.9	15455	17820	20190	23580	26130	28750	34230	37066	97510	105800	114300	125300	134700	144300	157700									
CRC	6.7665	16.4857	30.96	49.16	69.46	90.6349	160.18	184.7	209.3	244.4	270.8	298.0	354.8	384.168	1010.6	1097	1185	1299	1396	1496	1634	1721.4	7481.7	7894.81						
25 Mn manganese
use	717.3	1509.0	3248	4940	6990	9220	11500	18770	21400	23960	27590	30330	33150	38880	41987	109480	118100	127100	138600	148500	158600	172500	181380	785450	827067					
WEL	717.3	1509.0	3248	4940	6990	9220	11500	18770	21400	23960	27590	30330	33150	38880	41987	109480	118100	127100	138600	148500	158600									
CRC	7.43402	15.63999	33.668	51.2	72.4	95.6	119.203	194.5	221.8	248.3	286.0	314.4	343.6	403.0	435.163	1134.7	1224	1317	1437	1539	1644	1788	1879.9	8140.6	8571.94					
26 Fe iron
use	762.5	1561.9	2957	5290	7240	9560	12060	14580	22540	25290	28000	31920	34830	37840	44100	47206	122200	131000	140500	152600	163000	173600	188100	195200	851800	895161				
WEL	762.5	1561.9	2957	5290	7240	9560	12060	14580	22540	25290	28000	31920	34830	37840	44100	47206	122200	131000	140500	152600	163000									
CRC	7.9024	16.1878	30.652	54.8	75.0	99.1	124.98	151.06	233.6	262.1	290.2	330.8	361.0	392.2	457	489.256	1266	1358	1456	1582	1689	1799	1950	2023	8828	9277.69				
27 Co cobalt
use	760.4	1648	3232	4950	7670	9840	12440	15230	17959	26570	29400	32400	36600	39700	42800	49396	52737	134810	145170	154700	167400	178100	189300	204500	214100	920870	966023			
WEL	760.4	1648	3232	4950	7670	9840	12440	15230	17959	26570	29400	32400	36600	39700	42800	49396	52737	134810	145170	154700	167400									
CRC	7.8810	17.083	33.50	51.3	79.5	102.0	128.9	157.8	186.13	275.4	305	336	379	411	444	511.96	546.58	1397.2	1504.6	1603	1735	1846	1962	2119	2219.0	9544.1	10012.12			
28 Ni nickel
use	737.1	1753.0	3395	5300	7339	10400	12800	15600	18600	21670	30970	34000	37100	41500	44800	48100	55101	58570	148700	159000	169400	182700	194000	205600	221400	231490	992718	1039668		
WEL	737.1	1753.0	3395	5300	7339	10400	12800	15600	18600	21670	30970	34000	37100	41500	44800	48100	55101	58570	148700	159000	169400									
CRC	7.6398	18.16884	35.19	54.9	76.06	108	133	162	193	224.6	321.0	352	384	430	464	499	571.08	607.06	1541	1648	1756	1894	2011	2131	2295	2399.2	10288.8	10775.40		
29 Cu copper
use	745.5	1957.9	3555	5536	7700	9900	13400	16000	19200	22400	25600	35600	38700	42000	46700	50200	53700	61100	64702	163700	174100	184900	198800	210500	222700	239100	249660	1067358	1116105	
WEL	745.5	1957.9	3555	5536	7700	9900	13400	16000	19200	22400	25600	35600	38700	42000	46700	50200	53700	61100	64702	163700	174100									
CRC	7.72638	20.29240	36.841	57.38	79.8	103	139	166	199	232	265.3	369	401	435	484	520	557	633	670.588	1697	1804	1916	2060	2182	2308	2478	2587.5	11062.38	11567.617	
30 Zn zinc
use	906.4	1733.3	3833	5731	7970	10400	12900	16800	19600	23000	26400	29990	40490	43800	47300	52300	55900	59700	67300	71200	179100									
WEL	906.4	1733.3	3833	5731	7970	10400	12900	16800	19600	23000	26400	29990	40490	43800	47300	52300	55900	59700	67300	71200	179100									
CRC	9.3942	17.96440	39.723	59.4	82.6	108	134	174	203	238	274	310.8	419.7	454	490	542	579	619	698	738	1856									
31 Ga gallium
use	578.8	1979.3	2963	6180																										
WEL	578.8	1979.3	2963	6180																										
CRC	5.99930	20.5142	30.71	64																										
32 Ge germanium
use	762	1537.5	3302.1	4411	9020																									
WEL	762	1537.5	3302.1	4411	9020																									
CRC	7.8994	15.93462	34.2241	45.7131	93.5																									
33 As arsenic
use	947.0	1798	2735	4837	6043	12310																								
WEL	947.0	1798	2735	4837	6043	12310																								
CRC	9.7886	18.633	28.351	50.13	62.63	127.6																								
34 Se selenium
use	941.0	2045	2973.7	4144	6590	7880	14990																							
WEL	941.0	2045	2973.7	4144	6590	7880	14990																							
CRC	9.75238	21.19	30.8204	42.9450	68.3	81.7	155.4																							
35 Br bromine
use	1139.9	2103	3470	4560	5760	8550	9940	18600																						
WEL	1139.9	2103	3470	4560	5760	8550	9940	18600																						
CRC	11.81381	21.8	36	47.3	59.7	88.6	103.0	192.8																						
36 Kr krypton
use	1350.8	2350.4	3565	5070	6240	7570	10710	12138	22274	25880	29700	33800	37700	43100	47500	52200	57100	61800	75800	80400	85300	90400	96300	101400	111100	116290	282500	296200	311400	326200
WEL	1350.8	2350.4	3565	5070	6240	7570	10710	12138	22274	25880	29700	33800	37700	43100	47500	52200	57100	61800	75800	80400	85300									
CRC	13.99961	24.35985	36.950	52.5	64.7	78.5	111.0	125.802	230.85	268.2	308	350	391	447	492	541	592	641	786	833	884	937	998	1051	1151	1205.3	2928	3070	3227	3381
37 Rb rubidium
use	403.0	2633	3860	5080	6850	8140	9570	13120	14500	26740																				
WEL	403.0	2633	3860	5080	6850	8140	9570	13120	14500	26740																				
CRC	4.17713	27.285	40	52.6	71.0	84.4	99.2	136	150	277.1																				
38 Sr strontium
use	549.5	1064.2	4138	5500	6910	8760	10230	11800	15600	17100	31270																			
WEL	549.5	1064.2	4138	5500	6910	8760	10230	11800	15600	17100																				
CRC	5.6949	11.03013	42.89	57	71.6	90.8	106	122.3	162	177	324.1																			
39 Y yttrium
use	600	1180	1980	5847	7430	8970	11190	12450	14110	18400	19900	36090																		
WEL	600	1180	1980	5847	7430	8970	11190	12450	14110	18400																				
CRC	6.2171	12.24	20.52	60.597	77.0	93.0	116	129	146.2	191	206	374.0																		
40 Zr zirconium
use	640.1	1270	2218	3313	7752	9500																								
WEL	640.1	1270	2218	3313	7752	9500																								
CRC	6.63390	13.13	22.99	34.34	80.348																									
41 Nb niobium
use	652.1	1380	2416	3700	4877	9847	12100																							
WEL	652.1	1380	2416	3700	4877	9847	12100																							
CRC	6.75885	14.32	25.04	38.3	50.55	102.057	125																							
42 Mo molybdenum
use	684.3	1560	2618	4480	5257	6640.8	12125	13860	15835	17980	20190	22219	26930	29196	52490	55000	61400	67700	74000	80400	87000	93400	98420	104400	121900	127700	133800	139800	148100	154500
WEL	684.3	1560	2618	4480	5257	6640.8	12125	13860	15835	17980	20190	22219	26930	29196	52490	55000	61400	67700	74000	80400	87000									
CRC	7.09243	16.16	27.13	46.4	54.49	68.8276	125.664	143.6	164.12	186.4	209.3	230.28	279.1	302.60	544.0	570	636	702	767	833	902	968	1020	1082	1263	1323	1387	1449	1535	1601
43 Tc technetium
use	686.9	1470	2850																											
WEL	702	1470	2850																											
CRC	7.28	15.26	29.54																											
Mattolat et al.	7.119380(32) eV																													
44 Ru ruthenium
use	710.2	1620	2747																											
WEL	710.2	1620	2747																											
CRC	7.36050	16.76	28.47																											
45 Rh rhodium
use	719.7	1740	2997																											
WEL	719.7	1740	2997																											
CRC	7.45890	18.08	31.06																											
46 Pd palladium
use	804.4	1870	3177																											
WEL	804.4	1870	3177																											
CRC	8.3369	19.43	32.93																											
47 Ag silver
use	731.0	2070	3361																											
WEL	731.0	2070	3361																											
CRC	7.5762	21.49	34.83																											
48 Cd cadmium
use	867.8	1631.4	3616																											
WEL	867.8	1631.4	3616																											
CRC	8.9938	16.90832	37.48																											
49 In indium
use	558.3	1820.7	2704	5210																										
WEL	558.3	1820.7	2704	5210																										
CRC	5.78636	18.8698	28.03	54																										
50 Sn tin
use	708.6	1411.8	2943.0	3930.3	7456																									
WEL	708.6	1411.8	2943.0	3930.3	7456																									
CRC	7.3439	14.63225	30.50260	40.73502	72.28																									
51 Sb antimony
use	834	1594.9	2440	4260	5400	10400																								
WEL	834	1594.9	2440	4260	5400	10400																								
CRC	8.6084	16.53051	25.3	44.2	56	108																								
52 Te tellurium
use	869.3	1790	2698	3610	5668	6820	13200																							
WEL	869.3	1790	2698	3610	5668	6820	13200																							
CRC	9.0096	18.6	27.96	37.41	58.75	70.7	137																							
53 I iodine
use	1008.4	1845.9	3180																											
WEL	1008.4	1845.9	3180																											
CRC	10.45126	19.1313	33																											
54 Xe xenon
use	1170.4	2046.4	3099.4																											
WEL	1170.4	2046.4	3099.4																											
CRC	12.1298	21.20979	32.1230																											
55 Cs caesium
use	375.7	2234.3	3400																											
WEL	375.7	2234.3	3400																											
CRC	3.89390	23.15745																												
56 Ba barium
use	502.9	965.2	3600																											
WEL	502.9	965.2	3600																											
CRC	5.21170	10.00390																												
57 La lanthanum
use	538.1	1067	1850.3	4819	5940																									
WEL	538.1	1067	1850.3	4819	5940																									
CRC	5.5769	11.060	19.1773	49.95	61.6																									
58 Ce cerium
use	534.4	1050	1949	3547	6325	7490																								
WEL	534.4	1050	1949	3547	6325	7490																								
CRC	5.5387	10.85	20.198	36.758	65.55	77.6																								
59 Pr praseodymium
use	527	1020	2086	3761	5551																									
WEL	527	1020	2086	3761	5551																									
CRC	5.473	10.55	21.624	38.98	57.53																									
60 Nd neodymium
use	533.1	1040	2130	3900																										
WEL	533.1	1040	2130	3900																										
CRC	5.5250	10.73	22.1	40.41																										
61 Pm promethium
use	540	1050	2150	3970																										
WEL	540	1050	2150	3970																										
CRC	5.582	10.90	22.3	41.1																										
62 Sm samarium
use	544.5	1070	2260	3990																										
WEL	544.5	1070	2260	3990																										
CRC	5.6436	11.07	23.4	41.4																										
63 Eu europium
use	547.1	1085	2404	4120																										
WEL	547.1	1085	2404	4120																										
CRC	5.6704	11.241	24.92	42.7																										
64 Gd gadolinium
use	593.4	1170	1990	4250																										
WEL	593.4	1170	1990	4250																										
CRC	6.1501	12.09	20.63	44.0																										
65 Tb terbium
use	565.8	1110	2114	3839																										
WEL	565.8	1110	2114	3839																										
CRC	5.8638	11.52	21.91	39.79																										
66 Dy dysprosium
use	573.0	1130	2200	3990																										
WEL	573.0	1130	2200	3990																										
CRC	5.9389	11.67	22.8	41.47																										
67 Ho holmium
use	581.0	1140	2204	4100																										
WEL	581.0	1140	2204	4100																										
CRC	6.0215	11.80	22.84	42.5																										
68 Er erbium
use	589.3	1150	2194	4120																										
WEL	589.3	1150	2194	4120																										
CRC	6.1077	11.93	22.74	42.7																										
69 Tm thulium
use	596.7	1160	2285	4120																										
WEL	596.7	1160	2285	4120																										
CRC	6.18431	12.05	23.68	42.7																										
70 Yb ytterbium
use	603.4	1174.8	2417	4203																										
WEL	603.4	1174.8	2417	4203																										
CRC	6.25416	12.1761	25.05	43.56																										
71 Lu lutetium
use	523.5	1340	2022.3	4370	6445																									
WEL	523.5	1340	2022.3	4370	6445																									
CRC	5.4259	13.9	20.9594	45.25	66.8																									
72 Hf hafnium
use	658.5	1440	2250	3216																										
WEL	658.5	1440	2250	3216																										
CRC	6.82507	14.9	23.3	33.33																										
73 Ta tantalum
use	761	1500																												
WEL	761	1500																												
CRC	7.5496																													
74 W tungsten
use	770	1700																												
WEL	770	1700																												
CRC	7.8640																													
75 Re rhenium
use	760	1260	2510	3640																										
WEL	760	1260	2510	3640																										
CRC	7.8335																													
76 Os osmium
use	840	1600																												
WEL	840	1600																												
CRC	8.4382																													
77 Ir iridium
use	880	1600																												
WEL	880	1600																												
CRC	8.9670																													
78 Pt platinum
use	870	1791																												
WEL	870	1791																												
CRC	8.9587	18.563	28																											
79 Au gold
use	890.1	1980																												
WEL	890.1	1980																												
CRC	9.2255	20.5	30																											
80 Hg mercury
use	1007.1	1810	3300																											
WEL	1007.1	1810	3300																											
CRC	10.43750	18.756	34.2																											
81 Tl thallium
use	589.4	1971	2878																											
WEL	589.4	1971	2878																											
CRC	6.1082	20.428	29.83																											
82 Pb lead
use	715.6	1450.5	3081.5	4083	6640																									
WEL	715.6	1450.5	3081.5	4083	6640																									
CRC	7.41666	15.0322	31.9373	42.32	68.8																									
83 Bi bismuth
use	703	1610	2466	4370	5400	8520																								
WEL	703	1610	2466	4370	5400	8520																								
CRC	7.2856	16.69	25.56	45.3	56.0	88.3																								
84 Po polonium
use	812.1																													
WEL	812.1																													
CRC	8.417																													
85 At astatine
use	899.003																													
WEL	920																													
CRC
talk	Originally quoted as 9.31751(8) eV.																													
86 Rn radon
use	1037																													
WEL	1037																													
CRC	10.74850																													
87 Fr francium
use	380																													
WEL	380																													
CRC	4.0727																													
talk	Andreev, S.V.; Letokhov, V.S.; Mishin, V.I. (1987). "Laser resonance photoionization spectroscopy of Rydberg levels in Fr". Phys. Rev. Lett. 59 (12): 1274–76. Bibcode:1987PhRvL..59.1274A. doi:10.1103/PhysRevLett.59.1274. PMID 10035190. give 4.0712±0.00004 eV (392.811(4) kJ/mol)																													
88 Ra radium
use	509.3	979.0																												
WEL	509.3	979.0																												
CRC	5.2784	10.14716																												
89 Ac actinium
use	499	1170																												
WEL	499	1170																												
CRC	5.17	12.1																												
90 Th thorium
use	587	1110	1930	2780																										
WEL	587	1110	1930	2780																										
CRC	6.3067	11.5	20.0	28.8																										
91 Pa protactinium
use	568																													
WEL	568																													
CRC	5.89																													
92 U uranium
use	597.6	1420																												
WEL	597.6	1420																												
CRC	6.19405	14.72																												
93 Np neptunium
use	604.5																													
WEL	604.5																													
CRC	6.2657																													
94 Pu plutonium
use	584.7																													
WEL	584.7																													
CRC	6.0262																													
95 Am americium
use	578																													
WEL	578																													
CRC	5.9738																													
96 Cm curium
use	581																													
WEL	581																													
CRC	5.9915																													
97 Bk berkelium
use	601																													
WEL	601																													
CRC	6.1979																													
98 Cf californium
use	608																													
WEL	608																													
CRC	6.2817																													
99 Es einsteinium
use	619																													
WEL	619																													
CRC	6.42																													
100 Fm fermium
use	627																													
WEL	627																													
CRC	6.50																													
101 Md mendelevium
use	635																													
WEL	635																													
CRC	6.58																													
102 No nobelium
use	642																													
WEL
CRC	6.65																													
103 Lr lawrencium
use	470																													
WEL
CRC	4.9																													
104 Rf rutherfordium
use	580																													
WEL
CRC	6.0																													

== Notes ==
- Values from CRC are ionization energies given in the unit eV; other values are molar ionization energies given in the unit kJ/mol. The first of these quantities is used in atomic physics, the second in chemistry, but both refer to the same basic property of the element. To convert from "value of ionization energy" to the corresponding "value of molar ionization energy", the conversion is:
  1 eV = 96.48534 kJ/mol
  1 kJ/mol = 0.0103642688 eV

== See also ==
- Molar ionization energies of the elements
