= CHARISSA =

Nuclear structure research collaboration

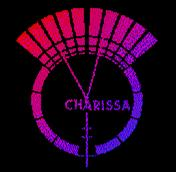
CHARISSA Collaboration Logo

CHARISSA (derived from 'CHARged particle Instrumentation for a Solid State Array') is a nuclear structure research collaboration originally conceived, initiated and partially built by Dr. William Rae of the University of Oxford (retired) and now run by the School of Physics and Astronomy at the University of Birmingham, UK. The other members of the collaboration are the University of Surrey with occasional contributions from LPC CAEN and Ruđer Bošković Institute, Zagreb. The collaboration is funded by the Science and Technology Facilities Council (STFC).

== Experiments ==
The CHARISSA collaboration carries out experiments at many of the world's leading research centres. Due to the nature of the research experiments performed must be undertaken with the use of a particle accelerator and complex detection systems. The group probes the structure of nuclei.

=== Accelerators ===
Experiments are currently being carried out utilising the following facilities:

- 14UD Tandem Van de Graaf, Australian National University (ANU), Canberra, Australia.
- Cyclotrons, Grand Accélérateur National d'Ions Lourds (GANIL), Caen, France.
- MP Tandem Van de Graaf, Institut de Physique Nucléaire (IPN), Orsay, France.
- MP Tandem Van de Graaf, Technical University of Munich (TUM)/LMU Munich, Munich, Germany.
- Tandem-Linac, Florida State University (FSU), Tallahassee, USA.
- Tandem Van de Graaf, Oak Ridge National Laboratory (ORNL), Oak Ridge, USA.
- UNILAC/Synchrotron, Gesellschaft für Schwerionenforschung (GSI), Darmstadt, Germany.

Previous experiments have taken place using the following accelerators at their respective facilities:

- VIVITRON, Institut de Recherches Subatomiques (IReS), Strasbourg, France.
- Cyclotron, Hahn-Meitner-Institut (HMI), Berlin, Germany.
- UCLouvain CycLoNe, Cyclotron Research Center (CRC), Louvain-la-Neuve, Belgium.

== See also ==
- Nuclear physics
- Particle accelerator
