= Ben Roy Mottelson =

American-Danish nuclear physicist (1926–2022)

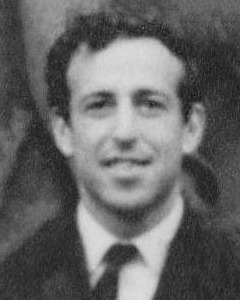
- Mottelson 1963 in Copenhagen
- Born: 9 July 1926; Chicago, Illinois, U.S.
- Died: 13 May 2022 (aged 95); Copenhagen, Denmark
- Citizenship: American, Danish
- Education: Purdue University (BS); Harvard University (PhD)
- Known for: Geometry of atomic nuclei
- Spouse(s): Nancy Jane Reno (m. 1948; died 1975) Britta Marger Siegumfeldt (m. 1983)
- Awards: Atoms for Peace Award (1969); John Price Wetherill Medal (1974); Nobel Prize in Physics (1975); Marian Smoluchowski Medal (1980)
- Scientific career
- Fields: Nuclear physics
- Workplaces: Nordita
- Thesis: The ground states of lithium-6 and lithium-7 (1950)
- Doctoral advisor: Julian Schwinger

Benjamin Roy Mottelson (9 July 1926 – 13 May 2022) was an American-Danish nuclear physicist. He won the 1975 Nobel Prize in Physics for his work on the non-spherical geometry of atomic nuclei.

== Early life ==
Mottelson was born in Chicago, Illinois, on 9 July 1926, the son of Georgia (Blum) and Goodman Mottelson, an engineer. His family was Jewish. After graduating from Lyons Township High School in La Grange, Illinois, he joined the United States Navy and was sent to attend officers training at Purdue University, where he received a bachelor's degree in 1947. He then earned a PhD in nuclear physics from Harvard University in 1950. His thesis adviser was Julian Schwinger, the theoretical physicist who won the Nobel Prize in 1965 for his work on quantum electrodynamics.

== Career ==
He moved to Institute for Theoretical Physics (later the Niels Bohr Institute) at the University of Copenhagen on the Sheldon Traveling Fellowship from Harvard, and remained in Denmark. In 1953 he was appointed staff member in CERN's Theoretical Study Group, which was based in Copenhagen, a position he held until he became professor at the newly formed Nordic Institute for Theoretical Physics (Nordita) in 1957. He was a visiting professor at the University of California, Berkeley in Spring 1959. In 1971 he became a naturalized Danish citizen.

In 1950–1951, James Rainwater and Aage Bohr had developed models of the atomic nucleus which began to take into account the behaviour of the individual nucleons. These models, which moved beyond the simpler liquid drop treatment of the nucleus as having effectively no internal structure, were the first models which could explain a number of nuclear properties, including the non-spherical distribution of charge in certain nuclei. Mottelson worked with Aage Bohr to compare the theoretical models with experimental data. In 1952–1953, Bohr and Mottelson published a series of papers demonstrating close agreement between theory and experiment, for example showing that the energy levels of certain nuclei could be described by a rotation spectrum. This work stimulated new theoretical and experimental studies.

In the summer of 1957, David Pines visited Copenhagen, and introduced Bohr and Mottelson to the pairing effect developed in theories of superconductivity, which inspired them to introduce a similar pairing effect to explain the differences in the energy levels between even and odd atomic nuclei.

=== Nobel Prize (1975) ===
Rainwater, Bohr and Mottelson were jointly awarded the 1975 Nobel Prize in Physics "for the discovery of the connection between collective motion and particle motion in atomic nuclei and the development of the theory of the structure of the atomic nucleus based on this connection".

=== Post–Nobel Prize work ===
Bohr and Mottelson continued to work together, publishing a two-volume monograph, Nuclear Structure. The first volume, Single-Particle Motion, appeared in 1969, and the second volume, Nuclear Deformations, in 1975.

Professor Mottelson was a member of the board of sponsors of the Bulletin of the Atomic Scientists.

He was an honorary member of the Finnish Society of Sciences and Letters, a member of the American Philosophical Society, and a foreign fellow of Bangladesh Academy of Sciences and the Norwegian Academy of Science and Letters. In 1969, he received the Atoms for Peace Award. He acted as director of ECT* (Trento, Italy) from 1993 to 1997.

== Personal life ==
Mottelson was a dual citizen, as he held both Danish and American passports. He lived in Copenhagen. Mottelson was married to Nancy Jane Reno from 1948 until her death in 1975, and they had two sons and one daughter. Mottelson then married Britta Marger Siegumfeldt in 1983.

He died on 13 May 2022, in Copenhagen at the age of 95.

== See also ==
- List of Jewish Nobel laureates
