= Semi-empirical mass formula =

Formula to approximate nuclear mass based on nucleon counts

In nuclear physics, the semi-empirical mass formula (SEMF; sometimes also called the Weizsäcker formula, Bethe–Weizsäcker formula, or Bethe–Weizsäcker mass formula to distinguish it from the Bethe–Weizsäcker process) is used to approximate the mass of an atomic nucleus from its number of protons and neutrons. As the name suggests, it is based partly on theory and partly on empirical measurements. The formula represents the liquid-drop model proposed by George Gamow, which can account for most of the terms in the formula and gives rough estimates for the values of the coefficients. It was first formulated in 1935 by German physicist Carl Friedrich von Weizsäcker, and although refinements have been made to the coefficients over the years, the structure of the formula remains the same today.

The formula gives a good approximation for atomic masses and thereby other effects. However, it fails to explain the existence of lines of greater binding energy at certain numbers of protons and neutrons. These numbers, known as magic numbers, are the foundation of the nuclear shell model.

== Liquid-drop model ==
Illustration of the terms of the semi-empirical mass formula in the liquid-drop model of the atomic nucleus

The liquid-drop model was first proposed by George Gamow and further developed by Niels Bohr, John Archibald Wheeler and Lise Meitner. It treats the nucleus as a drop of incompressible fluid of very high density, held together by the nuclear force (a residual effect of the strong force): there is a similarity to the structure of a spherical liquid drop. While a crude model, the liquid-drop model accounts for the spherical shape of most nuclei and makes a rough prediction of binding energy.

The corresponding mass formula is defined purely in terms of the numbers of protons and neutrons it contains. The original Weizsäcker formula defines five terms:

- Volume energy, when an assembly of nucleons of the same size is packed together into the smallest volume, each interior nucleon has a certain number of other nucleons in contact with it. So, this nuclear energy is proportional to the volume.
- Surface energy corrects for the previous assumption made that every nucleon interacts with the same number of other nucleons. This term is negative and proportional to the surface area, and is therefore roughly equivalent to liquid surface tension.
- Coulomb energy, the potential energy from each pair of protons. As this is a repelling force, the binding energy is reduced.
- Asymmetry energy (also called Pauli energy), which accounts for the Pauli exclusion principle. Unequal numbers of neutrons and protons imply filling higher energy levels for one type of particle, while leaving lower energy levels vacant for the other type.
- Pairing energy, which accounts for the tendency of proton pairs and neutron pairs to occur. An even number of particles is more stable than an odd number due to spin coupling.

== Formula ==
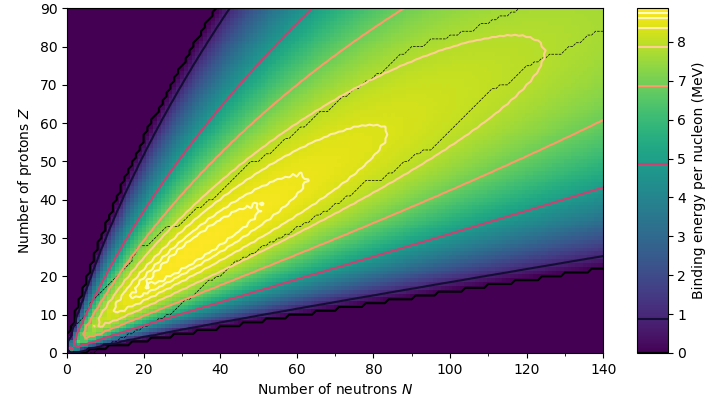
The binding energy per nucleon (in MeV) shown as a function of the neutron number N and atomic number Z as given by the semi-empirical mass formula. A dashed line is included to show nuclides that have been discovered by experiment.

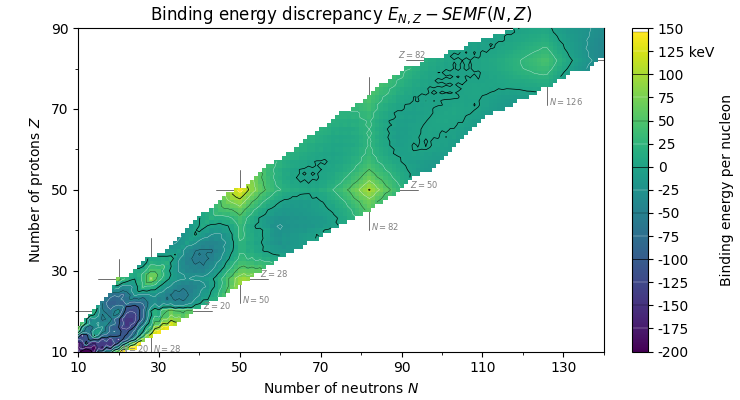
The difference between the energies predicted and that of known binding energies, given in kiloelectronvolts. Phenomena present can be explained by further subtle terms, but the mass formula cannot explain the presence of lines, clearly identifiable by sharp peaks in contours.

The mass of an atomic nucleus, for $N$ neutrons, $Z$ protons, and therefore $A = N + Z$ nucleons, is given by

$$m = N m_\text{n} + Z m_\text{p} - \frac{E_\text{B}(N,Z)}{c^2},$$

where $m_\text{n}$ and $m_\text{p}$ are the rest mass of a neutron and a proton respectively, and $E_\text{B}$ is the binding energy of the nucleus. The semi-empirical mass formula states the binding energy is

$$E_\text{B} = a_\text{V} A - a_\text{S} A^{2/3} - a_\text{C} \frac{Z(Z - 1)}{A^{1/3}} - a_\text{A} \frac{(N - Z)^2} A \pm \delta(N, Z).$$

The $\delta(N, Z)$ term is either zero or $\pm\delta_0$, depending on the parity of $N$ and $Z$, where $\delta_0 = {a_\text{P}}{A^{k_\text{P}}}$ for some exponent $k_\text{P}$. Note that as $A = N + Z$, the numerator of the $a_\text{A}$ term can be rewritten as $(A - 2Z)^2$.

Each of the terms in this formula has a theoretical basis. The coefficients $a_\text{V}$, $a_\text{S}$, $a_\text{C}$, $a_\text{A}$, and $a_\text{P}$ are determined empirically; while they may be derived from experiment, they are typically derived from least-squares fit to contemporary data. While typically expressed by its basic five terms, further terms exist to explain additional phenomena. Akin to how changing a polynomial fit will change its coefficients, the interplay between these coefficients as new phenomena are introduced is complex; some terms influence each other, whereas the $a_\text{P}$ term is largely independent.

=== Volume term ===
The term $a_\text{V} A$ is known as the volume term. The volume of the nucleus is proportional to A, so this term is proportional to the volume, hence the name.

The basis for this term is the strong nuclear force. The strong force affects both protons and neutrons, and as expected, this term is independent of Z. Because the number of pairs that can be taken from A particles is $A(A - 1)/2$, one might expect a term proportional to $A^2$. However, the strong force has a very limited range, and a given nucleon may only interact strongly with its nearest neighbors and next nearest neighbors. Therefore, the number of pairs of particles that actually interact is roughly proportional to A, giving the volume term its form.

The coefficient $a_\text{V}$ is smaller than the binding energy possessed by the nucleons with respect to their neighbors ($E_\text{b}$), which is of order of 40 MeV. This is because the larger the number of nucleons in the nucleus, the larger their kinetic energy is, due to the Pauli exclusion principle. If one treats the nucleus as a Fermi ball of $A$ nucleons, with equal numbers of protons and neutrons, then the total kinetic energy is $\tfrac{3}{5} A \varepsilon_\text{F}$, with $\varepsilon_\text{F}$ the Fermi energy, which is estimated as 38 MeV. Thus the expected value of $a_\text{V}$ in this model is $E_\text{b} - \tfrac{3}{5} \varepsilon_\text{F} \sim 17~\mathrm{MeV},$ not far from the measured value.

=== Surface term ===
The term $a_\text{S} A^{2/3}$ is known as the surface term. This term, also based on the strong force, is a correction to the volume term.

The volume term suggests that each nucleon interacts with a constant number of nucleons, independent of A. While this is very nearly true for nucleons deep within the nucleus, those nucleons on the surface of the nucleus have fewer nearest neighbors, justifying this correction. This can also be thought of as a surface-tension term, and indeed a similar mechanism creates surface tension in liquids.

If the volume of the nucleus is proportional to A, then the radius should be proportional to $A^{1/3}$ and the surface area to $A^{2/3}$. This explains why the surface term is proportional to $A^{2/3}$. It can also be deduced that $a_\text{S}$ should have a similar order of magnitude to $a_\text{V}$.

=== Coulomb term ===
The term $a_\text{C} \frac{Z(Z - 1)}{A^{1/3}}$ or $a_\text{C} \frac{Z^2}{A^{1/3}}$ is known as the Coulomb or electrostatic term.

The basis for this term is the electrostatic repulsion between protons. To a very rough approximation, the nucleus can be considered a sphere of uniform charge density. The potential energy of such a charge distribution can be shown to be

$$E = \frac{3}{5} \frac{1}{4 \pi \varepsilon_0} \frac{Q^2}{R},$$

where Q is the total charge, and R is the radius of the sphere. The value of $a_\text{C}$ can be approximately calculated by using this equation to calculate the potential energy, using an empirical nuclear radius of $R \approx r_0 A^{\frac{1}{3}}$ and Q = Ze. However, because electrostatic repulsion will only exist for more than one proton, $Z^2$ becomes $Z(Z - 1)$:

$$E = \frac{3}{5} \frac{1}{4 \pi \varepsilon_0} \frac{Q^2}{R} = \frac{3}{5} \frac{1}{4 \pi \varepsilon_0} \frac{(Ze)^2}{r_0 A^{1/3}} = \frac{3 e^2 Z^2}{20 \pi \varepsilon_0 r_0 A^{1/3}} \approx \frac{3 e^2 Z(Z - 1)}{20 \pi \varepsilon_0 r_0 A^{1/3}} = a_\text{C} \frac{Z(Z - 1)}{A^{1/3}},$$

where now the electrostatic Coulomb constant $a_\text{C}$ is

$$a_\text{C} = \frac{3 e^2}{20 \pi \varepsilon_0 r_0}.$$

Using the fine-structure constant, we can rewrite the value of $a_\text{C}$ as

$$a_\text{C} = \frac{3}{5} \frac{\hbar c \alpha}{r_0} = \frac{3}{5} \frac{R_\text{P}}{r_0} \alpha m_\text{p} c^2,$$

where $\alpha$ is the fine-structure constant, and $r_0 A^{1/3}$ is the radius of a nucleus, giving $r_0$ to be approximately 1.25 femtometers. $R_\text{P}$ is the proton reduced Compton wavelength, and $m_\text{p}$ is the proton mass. This gives $a_\text{C}$ an approximate theoretical value of 0.691 MeV, not far from the measured value.

=== Asymmetry term ===
Illustration of basis for asymmetric term

The term $a_\text{A} \frac{(N - Z)^2}{A}$ is known as the asymmetry term (or Pauli term).

The theoretical justification for this term is more complex. The Pauli exclusion principle states that no two identical fermions can occupy exactly the same quantum state in an atom. At a given energy level, there are only finitely many quantum states available for particles. What this means in the nucleus is that as more particles are "added", these particles must occupy higher energy levels, increasing the total energy of the nucleus (and decreasing the binding energy). Note that this effect is not based on any of the fundamental forces (gravitational, electromagnetic, etc.), only the Pauli exclusion principle.

Protons and neutrons, being distinct types of particles, occupy different quantum states. One can think of two different "pools" of states – one for protons and one for neutrons. Now, for example, if there are significantly more neutrons than protons in a nucleus, some of the neutrons will be higher in energy than the available states in the proton pool. If we could move some particles from the neutron pool to the proton pool, in other words, change some neutrons into protons, we would significantly decrease the energy. The imbalance between the number of protons and neutrons causes the energy to be higher than it needs to be, for a given number of nucleons. This is the basis for the asymmetry term.

The actual form of the asymmetry term can again be derived by modeling the nucleus as a Fermi ball of protons and neutrons. Its total kinetic energy is

$$E_\text{k} = \frac{3}{5} (Z \varepsilon_\text{F,p} + N \varepsilon_\text{F,n}),$$

where $\varepsilon_\text{F,p}$ and $\varepsilon_\text{F,n}$ are the Fermi energies of the protons and neutrons. Since these are proportional to $Z^{2/3}$ and $N^{2/3}$ respectively, one gets

$E_\text{k} = C (Z^{5/3} + N^{5/3})$ for some constant C.

The leading terms in the expansion in the difference $N - Z$ are then

$$E_\text{k} = \frac{C}{2^{2/3}} \left(A^{5/3} + \frac{5}{9} \frac{(N - Z)^2}{A^{1/3}}\right) + O\big((N - Z)^4\big).$$

At the zeroth order in the expansion the kinetic energy is just the overall Fermi energy $\varepsilon_\text{F} \equiv \varepsilon_\text{F,p} = \varepsilon_\text{F,n}$ multiplied by $\tfrac{3}{5} A$. Thus we get

$$E_\text{k} = \frac{3}{5} \varepsilon_\text{F} A + \frac{1}{3} \varepsilon_\text{F} \frac{(N - Z)^2}{A} + O\big((N - Z)^4\big).$$

The first term contributes to the volume term in the semi-empirical mass formula, and the second term is minus the asymmetry term (remember, the kinetic energy contributes to the total binding energy with a negative sign).

$\varepsilon_\text{F}$ is 38 MeV, so calculating $a_\text{A}$ from the equation above, we get only half the measured value. The discrepancy is explained by our model not being accurate: nucleons in fact interact with each other and are not spread evenly across the nucleus. For example, in the shell model, a proton and a neutron with overlapping wavefunctions will have a greater strong interaction between them and stronger binding energy. This makes it energetically favourable (i.e. having lower energy) for protons and neutrons to have the same quantum numbers (other than isospin), and thus increase the energy cost of asymmetry between them.

One can also understand the asymmetry term intuitively as follows. It should be dependent on the absolute difference $|N - Z|$, and the form $(N - Z)^2$ is simple and differentiable, which is important for certain applications of the formula. In addition, small differences between Z and N do not have a high energy cost. The A in the denominator reflects the fact that a given difference $|N - Z|$ is less significant for larger values of A.

=== Pairing term ===
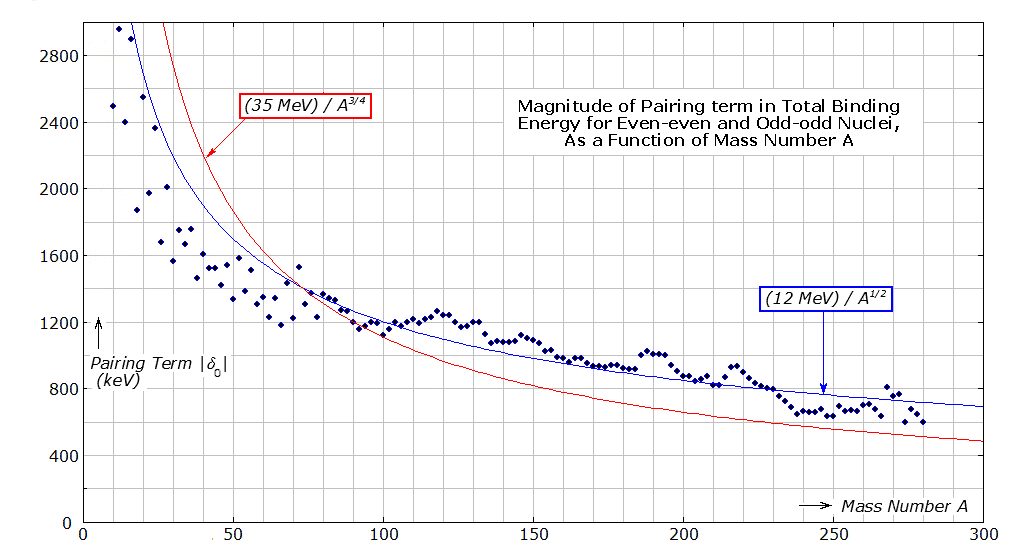
Magnitude of the pairing term in the total binding energy for even–even and odd–odd nuclei, as a function of mass number. Two fits are shown (blue and red line). The pairing term (positive for even–even and negative for odd–odd nuclei) was derived from binding energy data.

The term $\delta(A, Z)$ is known as the pairing term (possibly also known as the pairwise interaction). This term captures the effect of spin coupling. It is given by

$$\delta(A, Z) = \begin{cases}
+\delta_0 & \text{for even } Z, N ~(\text{even } A), \\
0 & \text{for odd } A, \\
-\delta_0 & \text{for odd } Z, N ~(\text{even } A),
\end{cases}$$

where $\delta_0$ is found empirically to have a value of about 1000 keV, slowly decreasing with mass number A. Odd-odd nuclei tend to undergo beta decay to an adjacent even-even nucleus by changing a neutron to a proton or vice versa. The pairs have overlapping wave functions and sit very close together with a bond stronger than any other configuration. When the pairing term is substituted into the binding energy equation, for even Z, N, the pairing term adds binding energy, and for odd Z, N the pairing term removes binding energy.

The dependence on mass number is commonly parametrized as

$$\delta_0 = a_\text{P} A^{k_\text{P}}.$$

The value of the exponent k_{P} is determined from experimental binding-energy data. In the past its value was often assumed to be −3/4, but modern experimental data indicate that a value of −1/2 is nearer the mark:

$\delta_0 = a_\text{P} A^{-1/2}$ or $\delta_0 = a_\text{P} A^{-3/4}.$

Due to the Pauli exclusion principle the nucleus would have a lower energy if the number of protons with spin up were equal to the number of protons with spin down. This is also true for neutrons. Only if both Z and N are even, can both protons and neutrons have equal numbers of spin-up and spin-down particles. This is a similar effect to the asymmetry term.

The factor $A^{k_\text{P}}$ is not easily explained theoretically. The Fermi-ball calculation we have used above, based on the liquid-drop model but neglecting interactions, will give an $A^{-1}$ dependence, as in the asymmetry term. This means that the actual effect for large nuclei will be larger than expected by that model. This should be explained by the interactions between nucleons. For example, in the shell model, two protons with the same quantum numbers (other than spin) will have completely overlapping wavefunctions and will thus have greater strong interaction between them and stronger binding energy. This makes it energetically favourable (i.e. having lower energy) for protons to form pairs of opposite spin. The same is true for neutrons.

== Calculating coefficients ==
The coefficients are calculated by fitting to experimentally measured masses of nuclei. Their values can vary depending on how they are fitted to the data and which unit is used to express the mass. Several examples are as shown below.

| | Eisberg & Resnick | Least-squares fit (1) | Least-squares fit (2) | Rohlf | Evans |
|---|---|---|---|---|---|
| unit | Da | MeV | MeV | MeV | MeV |
| $a_{\rm V}$ | 0.01691 | 15.8 | 15.76 | 15.75 | 14.1 |
| $a_{\rm S}$ | 0.01911 | 18.3 | 17.81 | 17.8 | 13 |
| $a_{\rm C}$ | 0.000763 (Note: This model uses $Z^2$ in the numerator of the Coulomb term.) | 0.714 | 0.711 | 0.711 | 0.595 |
| $a_{\rm A}$ | 0.10175 (Note: This model uses $(Z-A/2)^2$ in the numerator of the Asymmetry term.) | 23.2 | 23.702 | 23.7 | 19 |
| $a_{\rm P}$ | 0.012 | 12 | 34 | 11.18 | 33.5 |
| $k_{\rm P}$ | −1/2 | −1/2 | −3/4 | −1/2 | −3/4 |
| $\delta_0$ (even-even) | $-0.012 \over A^{1/2}$ | $+12 \over A^{1/2}$ | $+34 \over A^{3/4}$ | $+11.18 \over A^{1/2}$ | $+33.5 \over A^{3/4}$ |
| $\delta_0$ (odd-odd) | $+0.012 \over A^{1/2}$ | $-12 \over A^{1/2}$ | $-34 \over A^{3/4}$ | $-11.18 \over A^{1/2}$ | $-33.5 \over A^{3/4}$ |
| $\delta_0$ (even-odd, odd-even) | 0 | 0 | 0 | 0 | 0 |

The formula does not consider the internal shell structure of the nucleus.

The semi-empirical mass formula therefore provides a good fit to heavier nuclei, and a poor fit to very light nuclei, especially ^{4}He. For light nuclei, it is usually better to use a model that takes this shell structure into account.

== Examples of consequences of the formula ==
By maximizing E_{b}(A, Z) with respect to Z, one would find the best neutron–proton ratio N/Z for a given atomic weight A. It can be demonstrated that

$$N/Z \approx 1 + \frac{a_\text{C}}{2a_\text{A}} A^{2/3}.$$

This is roughly 1 for light nuclei, but for heavy nuclei the ratio grows in good agreement with experiment.

By substituting the above value of Z back into E_{b}, one obtains the binding energy as a function of the atomic weight, E_{b}(A). Maximizing E_{b}(A)/A with respect to A gives the nucleus which is most strongly bound, i.e. most stable. The value most tightly bound nucleus predicted is A=58 Z=26 (iron), with the second most bound being A=62 Z=28 (nickel). Experimental values show ^{62}Ni as the most bound nucleus.

The liquid-drop model also allows the computation of fission barriers for nuclei, which determine the stability of a nucleus against spontaneous fission. It was originally speculated that elements beyond atomic number 104 could not exist, as they would undergo fission with very short half-lives, though this formula did not consider stabilizing effects of closed nuclear shells. A modified formula considering shell effects reproduces known data and the predicted island of stability (in which fission barriers and half-lives are expected to increase, reaching a maximum at the shell closures), though also suggests a possible limit to existence of superheavy nuclei beyond Z = 120 and N = 184.

== Sources ==
- Freedman, R.; Young, H. (2004). Sears and Zemansky's University Physics with Modern Physics (11th ed.). Pearson Addison Wesley. pp. 1633–1634. ISBN 978-0-8053-8768-1.
- Liverhant, S. E. (1960). Elementary Introduction to Nuclear Reactor Physics. John Wiley & Sons. pp. 58–62. LCCN 60011725.
- Choppin, G.; Liljenzin, J.-O.; Rydberg, J. (2002). "Nuclear Mass and Stability" (PDF). Radiochemistry and Nuclear Chemistry (3rd ed.). Butterworth-Heinemann. pp. 41–57. ISBN 978-0-7506-7463-8.
