= Timeline of atomic and subatomic physics =

A timeline of atomic and subatomic physics, including particle physics.

== Antiquity ==
- 430 BCE Democritus speculates about fundamental indivisible particles—calls them "atoms"
- 2nd Century BCE Kanada (philosopher) proposes that anu is an indestructible particle of matter, an "atom"; anu is an abstraction and not observable.

== Beginnings of chemistry ==
- 1766 Henry Cavendish studies factitious airs (hydrogen)
- 1778 Carl Scheele and Antoine Lavoisier discover that air is composed mostly of nitrogen and oxygen
- 1781 Joseph Priestley creates water by igniting hydrogen and oxygen
- 1800 William Nicholson and Anthony Carlisle use electrolysis to separate water into hydrogen and oxygen
- 1803 John Dalton introduces atomic ideas into chemistry and states that matter is composed of atoms of different weights
- 1805 (approximate time) Thomas Young conducts the double-slit experiment with light
- 1811 Amedeo Avogadro claims that equal volumes of gases should contain equal numbers of molecules
- 1815 William Prout hypothesizes that all matter is built up from hydrogen, adumbrating the proton;
- 1832 Michael Faraday states his laws of electrolysis
- 1838 Richard Laming hypothesized a subatomic particle carrying electric charge;
- 1839 Alexandre Edmond Becquerel discovered the photovoltaic effect
- 1858 Julius Plücker produced cathode rays;
- 1871 Dmitri Mendeleyev systematically examines the periodic table and predicts the existence of gallium, scandium, and germanium
- 1873 Johannes van der Waals introduces the idea of weak attractive forces between molecules
- 1874 George Johnstone Stoney hypothesizes a minimum unit of electric charge. In 1891, he coins the word electron for it;
- 1885 Johann Balmer finds a mathematical expression for observed hydrogen line wavelengths
- 1886 Eugen Goldstein produced anode rays;
- 1887 Heinrich Hertz discovers the photoelectric effect
- 1894 Lord Rayleigh and William Ramsay discover argon by spectroscopically analyzing the gas left over after nitrogen and oxygen are removed from air
- 1895 William Ramsay discovers terrestrial helium by spectroscopically analyzing gas produced by decaying uranium
- 1896 Antoine Henri Becquerel discovers the radioactivity of uranium
- 1896 Pieter Zeeman studies the splitting of sodium D lines when sodium is held in a flame between strong magnetic poles
- 1897 J. J. Thomson discovered the electron;
- 1897 Emil Wiechert, Walter Kaufmann and J.J. Thomson discover the electron
- 1898 Marie and Pierre Curie discovered the existence of the radioactive elements radium and polonium in their research of pitchblende
- 1898 William Ramsay and Morris Travers discover neon, and negatively charged beta particles

== Modern physics ==
- 1887 Heinrich Rudolf Hertz discovers the photoelectric effect that will play a very important role in the development of the quantum theory with Einstein's explanation of this effect in terms of quanta of light
- 1896 Wilhelm Conrad Röntgen discovers the X-rays while studying electrons in plasma; scattering X-rays—that were considered as 'waves' of high-energy electromagnetic radiation—Arthur Compton will be able to demonstrate in 1922 the 'particle' aspect of electromagnetic radiation.
- 1899 Ernest Rutherford discovered the alpha and beta particles emitted by uranium;
- 1900 Johannes Rydberg refines the expression for observed hydrogen line wavelengths
- 1900 Max Planck states his quantum hypothesis and blackbody radiation law
- 1900 Paul Villard discovers gamma-rays while studying uranium decay
- 1902 Philipp Lenard observes that maximum photoelectron energies are independent of illuminating intensity but depend on frequency
- 1905 Albert Einstein explains the photoelectric effect
- 1906 Charles Barkla discovers that each element has a characteristic X-ray and that the degree of penetration of these X-rays is related to the atomic weight of the element
- 1908-1911 Jean Perrin proves the existence of atoms and molecules with experimental work to test Einstein's theoretical explanation of Brownian motion
- 1909 Ernest Rutherford and Thomas Royds demonstrate that alpha particles are doubly ionized helium atoms
- 1909 Hans Geiger and Ernest Marsden discover large angle deflections of alpha particles by thin metal foils
- 1911 Ernest Rutherford explains the Geiger–Marsden experiment by invoking a nuclear atom model and derives the Rutherford cross section
- 1911 Ștefan Procopiu measures the magnetic dipole moment of the electron
- 1912 Max von Laue suggests using crystal lattices to diffract X-rays
- 1912 Walter Friedrich and Paul Knipping diffract X-rays in zinc blende
- 1913 Max Bodenstein proposed chain reactions
- 1913 Henry Moseley shows that nuclear charge is the real basis for numbering the elements
- 1913 Johannes Stark demonstrates that strong electric fields will split the Balmer spectral line series of hydrogen
- 1913 Niels Bohr presents his quantum model of the atom
- 1913 Robert Millikan measures the fundamental unit of electric charge
- 1913 William Henry Bragg and William Lawrence Bragg work out the Bragg condition for strong X-ray reflection
- 1914 Ernest Rutherford suggests that the positively charged atomic nucleus contains protons
- 1914 James Franck and Gustav Hertz observe atomic excitation
- 1915 Arnold Sommerfeld develops a modified Bohr atomic model with elliptic orbits to explain relativistic fine structure
- 1916 Gilbert N. Lewis and Irving Langmuir formulate an electron shell model of chemical bonding
- 1917 Albert Einstein introduces the idea of stimulated radiation emission
- 1918 Ernest Rutherford notices that, when alpha particles were shot into nitrogen gas, his scintillation detectors showed the signatures of hydrogen nuclei.
- 1921 Alfred Landé introduces the Landé g-factor
- 1922 Arthur Compton studies X-ray photon scattering by electrons demonstrating the 'particle' aspect of electromagnetic radiation.
- 1922 Otto Stern and Walther Gerlach show "spin quantization"
- 1923 Lise Meitner discovers what is now referred to as the Auger process
- 1924 John Lennard-Jones proposes a semiempirical interatomic force law
- 1924 Louis de Broglie suggests that electrons may have wavelike properties in addition to their 'particle' properties; the wave–particle duality has been later extended to all fermions and bosons.
- 1924 Santiago Antúnez de Mayolo proposes a neutron.
- 1924 Satyendra Bose and Albert Einstein introduce Bose–Einstein statistics
- 1925 George Uhlenbeck and Samuel Goudsmit postulate electron spin
- 1925 Pierre Auger discovers the Auger process (2 years after Lise Meitner)
- 1925 Werner Heisenberg, Max Born, and Pascual Jordan formulate quantum matrix mechanics
- 1925 Wolfgang Pauli states the quantum exclusion principle for electrons
- 1926 Enrico Fermi discovers the spin–statistics connection, for particles that are now called 'fermions', such as the electron (of spin-1/2).
- 1926 Erwin Schrödinger proves that the wave and matrix formulations of quantum theory are mathematically equivalent
- 1926 Erwin Schrödinger states his nonrelativistic quantum wave equation and formulates quantum wave mechanics
- 1926 Gilbert N. Lewis introduces the term "photon", thought by him to be "the carrier of radiant energy."
- 1926 Oskar Klein and Walter Gordon state their relativistic quantum wave equation, now the Klein–Gordon equation
- 1926 Paul Dirac introduces Fermi–Dirac statistics
- 1927 Charles Drummond Ellis (along with James Chadwick and colleagues) finally establish clearly that the beta decay spectrum is in fact continuous and not discrete, posing a problem that will later be solved by theorizing (and later discovering) the existence of the neutrino.
- 1927 Clinton Davisson, Lester Germer, and George Paget Thomson confirm the wavelike nature of electrons
- 1927 Thomas and Fermi develop the Thomas–Fermi model
- 1927 Max Born interprets the probabilistic nature of wavefunctions
- 1927 Max Born and Robert Oppenheimer introduce the Born–Oppenheimer approximation
- 1927 Walter Heitler and Fritz London introduce the concepts of valence bond theory and apply it to the hydrogen molecule.
- 1927 Werner Heisenberg states the quantum uncertainty principle
- 1928 Chandrasekhara Raman studies optical photon scattering by electrons
- 1928 Charles G. Darwin and Walter Gordon solve the Dirac equation for a Coulomb potential
- 1928 Friedrich Hund and Robert S. Mulliken introduce the concept of molecular orbital
- 1928 Paul Dirac states the Dirac equation
- 1929 Nevill Mott derives the Mott cross section for the Coulomb scattering of relativistic electrons
- 1929 Oskar Klein discovers the Klein paradox
- 1929 Oskar Klein and Yoshio Nishina derive the Klein–Nishina cross section for high energy photon scattering by electrons
- 1930 Wolfgang Pauli postulated the neutrino to explain the energy spectrum of beta decays;
- 1930 Erwin Schrödinger predicts the zitterbewegung motion
- 1930 Fritz London explains van der Waals forces as due to the interacting fluctuating dipole moments between molecules
- 1930 Paul Dirac introduces electron hole theory
- 1931 Harold Urey discovers deuterium using evaporation concentration techniques and spectroscopy
- 1931 Irène Joliot-Curie and Frédéric Joliot observe but misinterpret neutron scattering in paraffin
- 1931 John Lennard-Jones proposes the Lennard-Jones interatomic potential
- 1931 Linus Pauling discovers resonance bonding and uses it to explain the high stability of symmetric planar molecules
- 1931 Paul Dirac shows that charge quantization can be explained if magnetic monopoles exist
- 1931 Wolfgang Pauli puts forth the neutrino hypothesis to explain the apparent violation of energy conservation in beta decay
- 1932 Paul Güttinger finds the Hellmann–Feynman theorem
- 1932 Carl D. Anderson discovers the positron
- 1932 James Chadwick discovers the neutron
- 1932 John Cockcroft and Ernest Walton split lithium and boron nuclei using proton bombardment
- 1932 Werner Heisenberg presents the proton–neutron model of the nucleus and uses it to explain isotopes
- 1932 Ettore Majorana, Ernst Stueckelberg, Lev Landau, and Clarence Zener independently discover the Landau–Zener transition
- 1933 Max Delbrück suggests that quantum effects will cause photons to be scattered by an external electric field
- 1934 Enrico Fermi publishes a very successful model of beta decay in which neutrinos were produced.
- 1934 Enrico Fermi suggests bombarding uranium atoms with neutrons to make a 93 proton element
- 1934 Irène Joliot-Curie and Frédéric Joliot bombard aluminium atoms with alpha particles to create artificially radioactive phosphorus-30
- 1934 Leó Szilárd realizes that nuclear chain reactions may be possible
- 1934 Lev Landau tells Edward Teller that non-linear molecules may have vibrational modes which remove the degeneracy of an orbitally degenerate state (Jahn–Teller effect)
- 1934 Pavel Cherenkov reports that light is emitted by relativistic particles traveling in a nonscintillating liquid
- 1935 Albert Einstein, Boris Podolsky, and Nathan Rosen put forth the EPR paradox
- 1935 Henry Eyring develops the transition state theory
- 1935 Hideki Yukawa presents a theory of the nuclear force and predicts the scalar meson
- 1935 Niels Bohr presents his analysis of the EPR paradox
- 1936 Carl D. Anderson discovered the muon while he studied cosmic radiation;
- 1936 Alexandru Proca formulates the relativistic quantum field equations for a massive vector meson of spin-1 as a basis for nuclear forces
- 1936 Eugene Wigner develops the theory of neutron absorption by atomic nuclei
- 1936 Hermann Arthur Jahn and Edward Teller present their systematic study of the symmetry types for which the Jahn–Teller effect is expected
- 1937 Carl Anderson proves experimentally the existence of the pion predicted by Yukawa's theory.
- 1937 Seth Neddermeyer, Carl Anderson, J.C. Street, and E.C. Stevenson discover muons using cloud chamber measurements of cosmic rays
- 1939 Gottfried von Droste and Siegfried Flügge and independently Lise Meitner and Otto Robert Frisch determine that nuclear fission is taking place in the Hahn–Strassmann experiments
- 1939 Otto Hahn and Fritz Strassmann bombard uranium salts with thermal neutrons and discover barium among the reaction products
- 1942 Enrico Fermi makes the first controlled nuclear chain reaction
- 1942 Ernst Stueckelberg introduces the propagator to positron theory and interprets positrons as negative energy electrons moving backwards through spacetime

== Rise of quantum field theory ==
- 1947 George Dixon Rochester and Clifford Charles Butler discovered the kaon, the first strange particle;
- 1947 Cecil Powell, César Lattes, and Giuseppe Occhialini discover the pi meson by studying cosmic ray tracks
- 1947 Richard Feynman presents his propagator approach to quantum electrodynamics
- 1947 Willis Lamb and Robert Retherford measure the Lamb–Retherford shift
- 1948 Hendrik Casimir predicts a rudimentary attractive Casimir force on a parallel plate capacitor
- 1951 Martin Deutsch discovers positronium
- 1952 David Bohm propose his interpretation of quantum mechanics
- 1953 Robert Wilson observes Delbruck scattering of 1.33 MeV gamma-rays by the electric fields of lead nuclei
- 1953 Charles H. Townes, collaborating with J. P. Gordon, and H. J. Zeiger, builds the first ammonia maser
- 1954 Chen Ning Yang and Robert Mills investigate a theory of hadronic isospin by demanding local gauge invariance under isotopic spin space rotations, the first non-Abelian gauge theory
- 1955 Owen Chamberlain, Emilio Segrè, Clyde Wiegand, and Thomas Ypsilantis discover the antiproton
- 1955 and 1956 Murray Gell-Mann and Kazuhiko Nishijima independently derive the Gell-Mann–Nishijima formula, which relates the baryon number, the strangeness, and the isospin of hadrons to the charge, eventually leading to the systematic categorization of hadrons and, ultimately, the quark model of hadron composition.
- 1956 Clyde Cowan and Frederick Reines discovered the (electron) neutrino;
- 1956 Chen Ning Yang and Tsung Lee propose parity violation by the weak nuclear force
- 1956 Chien Shiung Wu discovers parity violation by the weak force in decaying cobalt
- 1956 Frederick Reines and Clyde Cowan detect antineutrino
- 1957 Bruno Pontecorvo postulated the flavor oscillation;
- 1957 Gerhart Luders proves the CPT theorem
- 1957 Richard Feynman, Murray Gell-Mann, Robert Marshak, and E.C.G. Sudarshan propose a vector/axial vector (VA) Lagrangian for weak interactions.
- 1958 Marcus Sparnaay experimentally confirms the Casimir effect
- 1959 Yakir Aharonov and David Bohm predict the Aharonov–Bohm effect
- 1960 R.G. Chambers experimentally confirms the Aharonov–Bohm effect
- 1961 Jeffrey Goldstone considers the breaking of global phase symmetry
- 1961 Murray Gell-Mann and Yuval Ne'eman discover the Eightfold Way patterns, the SU(3) group
- 1962 Leon Lederman shows that the electron neutrino is distinct from the muon neutrino
- 1963 Eugene Wigner discovers the fundamental roles played by quantum symmetries in atoms and molecules

== Age of the Standard Model ==
- 1963 Nicola Cabibbo develops the mathematical matrix by which the first two (and ultimately three) generations of quarks can be predicted.
- 1963-1964 André Petermann, Murray Gell-Mann and George Zweig propose the quark/aces model
- 1964 François Englert, Robert Brout, Peter Higgs, Gerald Guralnik, C. R. Hagen, and Tom Kibble postulate that a fundamental quantum field, now called the Higgs field, permeates space and, by way of the Higgs mechanism, provides mass to all the elementary subatomic particles that interact with it. While the Higgs field is postulated to confer mass on quarks and leptons, it represents only a tiny portion of the masses of other subatomic particles, such as protons and neutrons. In these, gluons that bind quarks together confer most of the particle mass. The result is obtained independently by three groups: François Englert and Robert Brout; Peter Higgs, working from the ideas of Philip Anderson; and Gerald Guralnik, C. R. Hagen, and Tom Kibble.. The Higgs mechanism was originally proposed already in 1938 by Ernst Stueckelberg
- 1964 Murray Gell-Mann and George Zweig independently propose the quark model of hadrons, predicting the arbitrarily named up, down, and strange quarks. Gell-Mann is credited with coining the term quark, which he found in James Joyce's book Finnegans Wake.
- 1964 Sheldon Glashow and James Bjorken predict the existence of the charm quark. The addition is proposed because it allows for a better description of the weak interaction (the mechanism that allows quarks and other particles to decay), equalizes the number of known quarks with the number of known leptons, and implies a mass formula that correctly reproduced the masses of the known mesons.
- 1964 John Stewart Bell shows that all local hidden variable theories must satisfy Bell's inequality
- 1964 Peter Higgs considers the breaking of local phase symmetry
- 1964 Val Fitch and James Cronin observe CP violation by the weak force in the decay of K mesons
- 1967 Bruno Pontecorvo postulated neutrino oscillation;
- 1967 Steven Weinberg and Abdus Salam publish papers in which they describe Yang–Mills theory using the SU(2) X U(1) supersymmetry group, thereby yielding a mass for the W particle of the weak interaction via spontaneous symmetry breaking.
- 1967 Steven Weinberg puts forth his electroweak model of leptons
- 1968 Stanford University: Deep inelastic scattering experiments at the Stanford Linear Accelerator Center (SLAC) show that the proton contains much smaller, point-like objects and is therefore not an elementary particle. Physicists at the time are reluctant to identify these objects with quarks, instead calling them partons — a term coined by Richard Feynman. The objects that are observed at SLAC will later be identified as up and down quarks. Nevertheless, "parton" remains in use as a collective term for the constituents of hadrons (quarks, antiquarks, and gluons). The existence of the strange quark is indirectly validated by the SLAC's scattering experiments: not only is it a necessary component of Gell-Mann and Zweig's three-quark model, but it provides an explanation for the kaon (K) and pion (π) hadrons discovered in cosmic rays in 1947.
- 1969 John Clauser, Michael Horne, Abner Shimony and Richard Holt propose a polarization correlation test of Bell's inequality
- 1970 Sheldon Glashow, John Iliopoulos, and Luciano Maiani propose the charm quark
- 1971 Gerard 't Hooft shows that the Glashow-Salam-Weinberg electroweak model can be renormalized
- 1972 Stuart Freedman and John Clauser perform the first polarization correlation test of Bell's inequality
- 1973 Frank Anthony Wilczek discover the quark asymptotic freedom in the theory of strong interactions; receives the Lorentz Medal in 2002, and the Nobel Prize in Physics in 2004 for his discovery and his subsequent contributions to quantum chromodynamics.
- 1973 Makoto Kobayashi and Toshihide Maskawa note that the experimental observation of CP violation can be explained if an additional pair of quarks exist. The two new quarks are eventually named top and bottom.
- 1973 David Politzer and Frank Anthony Wilczek propose the asymptotic freedom of quarks
- 1974 Burton Richter and Samuel Ting: Charm quarks are produced almost simultaneously by two teams in November 1974 (see November Revolution) — one at SLAC under Burton Richter, and one at Brookhaven National Laboratory under Samuel Ting. The charm quarks are observed bound with charm antiquarks in mesons. The two discovering parties independently assign the discovered meson two different symbols, J and ψ; thus, it becomes formally known as the J/ψ meson. The discovery finally convinces the physics community of the quark model's validity.
- 1974 Robert J. Buenker and Sigrid D. Peyerimhoff introduce the multireference configuration interaction method.
- 1975 Martin Perl discovers the tau lepton, predicted by Antonino Zichichi in 1967
- 1977 Leon Lederman observes the bottom quark with his team at Fermilab. This discovery is a strong indicator of the top quark's existence: without the top quark, the bottom quark would be without a partner that is required by the mathematics of the theory. The bottom quark was theorised already in 1973 by Makoto Kobayashi and Toshihide Maskawa.
- 1977 Steve Herb finds the upsilon resonance implying the existence of the beauty/bottom quark
- 1979 Gluon observed indirectly in three-jet events at DESY;
- 1982 Alain Aspect, J. Dalibard, and G. Roger perform a polarization correlation test of Bell's inequality that rules out conspiratorial polarizer communication
- 1983 Carlo Rubbia and Simon van der Meer discovered the W and Z bosons;
- 1983 Carlo Rubbia, Simon van der Meer, and the CERN UA-1 collaboration find the W and Z intermediate vector bosons
- 1989 The Z intermediate vector boson resonance width indicates three quark–lepton generations
- 1994 The CERN LEAR Crystal Barrel Experiment justifies the existence of glueballs (exotic meson).
- 1995 The top quark is finally observed by a team at Fermilab after an 18-year search. It has a mass much greater than had been previously expected — almost as great as a gold atom.
- 1995 The D0 and CDF experiments at the Fermilab Tevatron discover the top quark.
- 1998 – The Super-Kamiokande (Japan) detector facility reports experimental evidence for neutrino oscillations, implying that at least one neutrino has mass.
- 1998 Super-Kamiokande (Japan) observes evidence for neutrino oscillations, implying that at least one neutrino has mass.
- 1999 Ahmed Zewail wins the Nobel prize in chemistry for his work on femtochemistry for atoms and molecules.
- 2000 scientists at Fermilab announce the first direct evidence for the tau neutrino, the third kind of neutrino in particle physics.
- 2000 CERN announced quark-gluon plasma, a new phase of matter.
- 2001 the Sudbury Neutrino Observatory (Canada) confirm the existence of neutrino oscillations. Lene Hau stops a beam of light completely in a Bose–Einstein condensate.
- 2001 The Sudbury Neutrino Observatory (Canada) confirms the existence of neutrino oscillations.
- 2005 the RHIC accelerator of Brookhaven National Laboratory generates a "perfect" fluid, perhaps the quark–gluon plasma.
- 2010 The Large Hadron Collider at CERN begins operation with the primary goal of searching for the Higgs boson.
- 2012 Higgs boson-like particle discovered at CERN's Large Hadron Collider (LHC).
- 2014 The LHCb experiment observes particles consistent with tetraquarks and pentaquarks
- 2014 The T2K and OPERA experiment observe the appearance of electron neutrinos and tau neutrinos in a muon neutrino beam

== See also ==
- Chronology of the universe
- History of subatomic physics
- History of quantum mechanics
- History of quantum field theory
- History of the molecule
- History of thermodynamics
- History of chemistry
- Golden age of physics
- Timeline of cosmological theories
- Timeline of particle physics technology
