= Gaussian fixed point =

RG fixed point giving a free theory

A Gaussian fixed point is a fixed point of the renormalization group flow which is noninteracting in the sense that it is described by a free field theory. The word Gaussian comes from the fact that the probability distribution is Gaussian at the Gaussian fixed point. This means that Gaussian fixed points are exactly solvable (trivially solvable in fact). Slight deviations from the Gaussian fixed point can be described by perturbation theory.

== See also ==
- UV fixed point
- IR fixed point
- Quantum triviality
