= Wave function renormalization =

Process to make sure wave functions can induce probability distributions

In quantum field theory, wave function renormalization is a rescaling (or renormalization) of quantum fields to take into account the effects of interactions.

For a noninteracting or free field, the field operator creates or annihilates a single particle with probability 1. Once interactions are included, however, this probability is modified in general to Z $\neq$ 1.

This appears when one calculates the propagator beyond leading order; e.g. for a scalar field,

$$\frac{i}{p^2 - m_0^2 + i \varepsilon} \rightarrow \frac{i Z}{p^2 - m^2 + i \varepsilon}$$

(The shift of the mass from m_{0} to m constitutes the mass renormalization.)

One possible wave function renormalization, which happens to be scale independent, is to rescale the fields so that the Lehmann weight (Z in the formula above) of their quanta is 1. For the purposes of studying renormalization group flows, if the coefficient of the kinetic term in the action at the scale Λ is Z, then the field is rescaled by $\sqrt{Z}$. A scale dependent wave function renormalization for a field means that that field has an anomalous scaling dimension.

== See also ==
- Renormalization
