= Quantum triviality =

Possible outcome of renormalization in physics

In physics, quantum triviality is a property of a quantum field theory in which a renormalization procedure results in no physical interaction.

Due to constant creation and annihilation of virtual particles, a physical vacuum is not empty space. As with ordinary continuous media, the physical vacuum possesses the ability of charge screening, which makes the effective charge a function of the length (or momentum) scale. Quantum triviality is a possible situation in quantum field theories, when the effective charge tends to zero in the limit of large length scales. In this case, the theory is said to be "trivial" or non-interacting.

== Quantum triviality and the renormalization group ==
The first evidence of possible triviality of quantum field theories was obtained in the context of quantum electrodynamics by Lev Landau, Alexei Abrikosov, and Isaak Khalatnikov who found the following relation between the observable charge g_{obs} and the "bare" charge g_{0}:

$g_\text{obs} = \frac{g_0}{1+\beta_2 g_0 \ln \Lambda/m}~,$	1

where m is the mass of the particle and Λ is the momentum cut-off. If g_{0} is finite, then g_{obs} tends to zero in the limit of infinite cut-off Λ.

Inverting the relationship in (1) and choosing $g_0$ (related to the length scale Λ^{−1} ) to give the value of $g_{obs}$ gives:

$g_0=\frac{g_{obs}}{1-\beta_2 g_{obs} \ln \Lambda/m}$	2

The growth of $g_0$ with Λ invalidates (1) and (2) in the region $g_0 \approx 1$ (since they were obtained for $g_0 \ll 1$) and existence of the “Landau pole" in (2) has no physical sense. The actual behavior of the charge $g(\mu)$ as a function of the momentum scale $\mu$ is determined by the Gell-Mann–Low equation

$\frac{dg}{d \ln \mu} =\beta(g)=\beta_2 g^2+\beta_3 g^3+\ldots,$	3

which leads to (1) and (2) if it is integrated under conditions $g(\mu)=g_{obs}$ for $\mu=m$ and $g(\mu)=g_0$ for $\mu=\Lambda$, when only the term with $\beta_2$ is retained in the right hand side. The general behavior of $g(\mu)$ depends on the appearance of the function $\beta(g)$. According to classification by Bogoliubov and Shirkov, there are three qualitatively different situations:

(a) if $\beta(g)$ has a zero at the finite value $g*$, then growth of $g$ is saturated, i.e. $g(\mu)\to g*$ for $\mu\to\infty$;

(b) if $\beta(g)$ has no non-trivial zeroes and behaves as $\beta(g) \propto g^\alpha$ with $\alpha\le 1$ for large $g$, then the growth of $g(\mu)$ continues to infinity;

(c) if $\beta(g) \propto g^\alpha$ with $\alpha>1$ for large $g$, then $g(\mu)$ is divergent at finite value $\mu_0$ and the real Landau pole arises: the theory is internally inconsistent due to indeterminacy of $g(\mu)$ for $\mu>\mu_0$.

The latter case corresponds to the quantum triviality in full theory (beyond its perturbation context), as can be seen by a reductio ad absurdum. Indeed, if $g_{obs}$ is finite, the theory is internally inconsistent. The only way to avoid it, is to tend $\mu_0$ to infinity, which is possible only for $g_{obs}\to 0$.

== Relation to Wilson triviality ==
Formula (1) is interpreted differently in the theory of critical phenomena. In this case, $\Lambda$ and $g_0$ have a direct physical sense, being related to the lattice spacing and the coefficient in the effective Landau Hamiltonian. The trivial theory with $g_{obs}=0$ is obtained in the limit $m\to 0$, which corresponds to the critical point. Such triviality has a physical sense and corresponds to absence of interaction between large-scale fluctuations of the order parameter. The fundamental question arises, whether such triviality holds for arbitrary (and not only small) values of $g_0$?

This question was investigated by Kenneth G. Wilson using the real-space renormalization group, which was developed from the qualitative scheme suggested by Leo P. Kadanoff, and strong evidence for the positive answer was obtained. Subsequent numerical investigations of the lattice field theory confirmed Wilson’s conclusion.

“Wilson triviality” signifies only that the $\beta$-function is non-alternating and does not possess non-trivial zeroes: it excludes only the case (a) in the Bogoliubov and Shirkov classification. The “true” quantum triviality is the more strong property, corresponding to the case (c). If “Wilson triviality” is confirmed by extensive numerical investigations and can be considered as firmly established, then the evidence of “true triviality” is scarce and allows different interpretation.

== The beta function ==
The beta function $\beta(g)$ was recently studied by different methods:

(1) by summation the usual perturbation series in powers of $g$, using the Lipatov asymptotics for the high-order terms;

(2) by summation the high temperature expansions, adjusted to reproduce the small $g$ behavior;

(3) establishing the analytical strong coupling asymptotics of $\beta(g)$ using the complex-valued bare charge $g_0$;

(4) establishing the same asymptotics using the real bare charge $g_0$ in the scheme without complex parameters.

All results are mutually consistent and correspond to the positive $\beta$-function with the strong coupling behavior $\beta(g)= \beta_\infty g$. It signifies that the $\varphi^4$ theory is in agreement with Wilson triviality, but does not possess the true quantum triviality.

Analogously, the positive $\beta$-function with the linear strong coupling asymptotics is established for quantum electrodynamics.

== Consequences for the Higgs sector ==
The "Higgs sector" of the Standard Model is analogous to the φ^{4} theory. If one suggests the true quantum triviality of this theory, then one will be able to establish the upper bound for a mass of the Higgs boson. It follows from the condition that the position of the Landau pole should be shifted to extremely large momenta, where unification with gravitation is expected. This triviality bound played a positive role in motivation of experiments for searching the Higgs boson. At present, when the Higgs boson is discovered, the triviality bound is not actual. In fact, this bound is invalid, since (according to the previous section) the Higgs sector is non-trivial. Correspondingly, the Standard Model is free from internal inconsistencies.

== See also ==
- Gaussian fixed point
- Hierarchy problem
