= Relativistic dynamics =

Dynamics describing relativistic and quantum motion

For classical dynamics at relativistic speeds, see relativistic mechanics.

Relativistic dynamics refers to a combination of relativistic and quantum concepts to describe the relationships between the motion and properties of a relativistic system and the forces acting on the system. What distinguishes relativistic dynamics from other physical theories is the use of an invariant scalar evolution parameter to monitor the historical evolution of space-time events. In a scale-invariant theory, the strength of particle interactions does not depend on the energy of the particles involved. Twentieth century experiments showed that the physical description of microscopic and submicroscopic objects moving at or near the speed of light raised questions about such fundamental concepts as space, time, mass, and energy. The theoretical description of the physical phenomena required the integration of concepts from relativity and quantum theory.

Vladimir Fock was the first to propose an evolution parameter theory for describing relativistic quantum phenomena, but the evolution parameter theory introduced by Ernst Stueckelberg is more closely aligned with recent work. Evolution parameter theories were used by Feynman, Schwinger and others to formulate quantum field theory in the late 1940s and early 1950s. Silvan S. Schweber wrote a historical exposition of Feynman's investigation of such a theory. A resurgence of interest in evolution parameter theories began in the 1970s with the work of Horwitz and Piron, and Fanchi and Collins.

== Invariant Evolution Parameter Concept ==
Some researchers view the evolution parameter as a mathematical artifact while others view the parameter as a physically measurable quantity. To understand the role of an evolution parameter and the fundamental difference between the standard theory and evolution parameter theories, it is necessary to review the concept of time.

Time t played the role of a monotonically increasing evolution parameter in classical Newtonian mechanics, as in the force law F = dP/dt for a non-relativistic, classical object with momentum P. To Newton, time was an “arrow” that parameterized the direction of evolution of a system.

Albert Einstein rejected the Newtonian concept and identified t as the fourth coordinate of a space-time four-vector. Einstein's view of time requires a physical equivalence between coordinate time and coordinate space. In this view, time should be a reversible coordinate in the same manner as space. Particles moving backward in time are often used to display antiparticles in Feynman-diagrams, but they are not thought of as really moving backward in time usually it is done to simplify notation. However a lot of people think they are really moving backward in time and take it as evidence for time reversibility.

The development of non-relativistic quantum mechanics in the early twentieth century preserved the Newtonian concept of time in the Schrödinger equation. The ability of non-relativistic quantum mechanics and special relativity to successfully describe observations motivated efforts to extend quantum concepts to the relativistic domain. Physicists had to decide what role time should play in relativistic quantum theory. The role of time was a key difference between Einsteinian and Newtonian views of classical theory. Two hypotheses that were consistent with special relativity were possible:

=== Hypothesis I ===
Assume t = Einsteinian time and reject Newtonian time.

=== Hypothesis II ===
Introduce two temporal variables:

- A coordinate time in the sense of Einstein
- An invariant evolution parameter in the sense of Newton

Hypothesis I led to a relativistic probability conservation equation that is essentially a re-statement of the non-relativistic continuity equation. Time in the relativistic probability conservation equation is Einstein's time and is a consequence of implicitly adopting Hypothesis I. By adopting Hypothesis I, the standard paradigm has at its foundation a temporal paradox: motion relative to a single temporal variable must be reversible even though the second law of thermodynamics establishes an “arrow of time” for evolving systems, including relativistic systems. Thus, even though Einstein's time is reversible in the standard theory, the evolution of a system is not time reversal invariant. From the perspective of Hypothesis I, time must be both an irreversible arrow tied to entropy and a reversible coordinate in the Einsteinian sense. The development of relativistic dynamics is motivated in part by the concern that Hypothesis I was too restrictive.

The problems associated with the standard formulation of relativistic quantum mechanics provide a clue to the validity of Hypothesis I. These problems included negative probabilities, hole theory, the Klein paradox, non-covariant expectation values, and so forth. Most of these problems were never solved; they were avoided when quantum field theory (QFT) was adopted as the standard paradigm. The QFT perspective, particularly its formulation by Schwinger, is a subset of the more general Relativistic Dynamics.

Relativistic Dynamics is based on Hypothesis II and employs two temporal variables: a coordinate time, and an evolution parameter. The evolution parameter, or parameterized time, may be viewed as a physically measurable quantity, and a procedure has been presented for designing evolution parameter clocks. By recognizing the existence of a distinct parameterized time and a distinct coordinate time, the conflict between a universal direction of time and a time that may proceed as readily from future to past as from past to future is resolved. The distinction between parameterized time and coordinate time removes ambiguities in the properties associated with the two temporal concepts in Relativistic Dynamics.

== See also ==
- Ernst Stueckelberg
