= Marcel Guénin =

Swiss mathematician and physicist

Marcel André Guénin (born 1937) is a theoretical physicist and mathematician, and Professor Emeritus of the University of Geneva.

He obtained his PhD in 1962 at the University of Geneva under the supervision of Ernst Stueckelberg with a thesis titled "Opérateurs de champ antilinéaires, T- et CP-covariance".

From 1983 to 1987 he was Rector of the University of Geneva.

Jean-Pierre Eckmann was one of his PhD students.
