= Peierls bracket =

Theoretical physics

In theoretical physics, the Peierls bracket is an equivalent description of the Poisson bracket. It can be defined directly from the action and does not require the canonical coordinates and their canonical momenta to be defined in advance.

The bracket

$$[A,B]$$

is defined as

$$D_A(B)-D_B(A)$$,

as the difference between some kind of action of one quantity on the other, minus the flipped term.

In quantum mechanics, the Peierls bracket becomes a commutator i.e. a Lie bracket.
