= Ernst Stueckelberg =

Swiss mathematician and physicist

Ernst Stueckelberg v. Breidenbach
- Born: 1 February 1905; Basel, Switzerland
- Died: 4 September 1984 (aged 79); Geneva, Switzerland
- Known for: Stueckelberg action Feynman–Stueckelberg interpretation Discovery of the renormalization group Beta function Semi-detailed balance Landau-Zener formula Conservation of baryon number
- Awards: Max Planck Medal (1976)
- Scientific career
- Doctoral advisor: August Hagenbach
- Doctoral students: Marcel Guénin; Constantin Piron; André Petermann

Ernst Carl Gerlach Stueckelberg (baptised as Johann Melchior Ernst Karl Gerlach Stückelberg, full name after 1911: Baron Ernst Carl Gerlach Stueckelberg von Breidenbach zu Breidenstein und Melsbach; 1 February 1905 – 4 September 1984) was a Swiss mathematician and physicist, regarded as one of the most eminent physicists of the 20th century.

He made key advances in theoretical physics, including the exchange particle model of fundamental forces, causal S-matrix theory, and the renormalization group.

His idiosyncratic style and publication in minor journals led to his work not being widely recognized until the mid-1990s.

== Early life ==
Born into a semi-aristocratic family in Basel in 1905, Stueckelberg's father was a lawyer, and his paternal grandfather was the distinguished Swiss artist also named Ernst Stückelberg. A highly gifted school student, Stueckelberg initially began a physics degree at the University of Basel in 1923.

== Career ==
While still a student, Stueckelberg was invited by the distinguished quantum theorist Arnold Sommerfeld, to attend his lectures at the Ludwig-Maximilians-Universität München. He went on to obtain a Ph.D. on cathode physics in 1927. Later that year, he went to Princeton University, becoming an assistant professor in 1930. He was elected a Fellow of the American Physical Society in 1931.

He returned to Switzerland in 1932, working first at the University of Basel before switching the following year to the University of Zurich. In 1934, he moved again to the University of Geneva, which together with the University of Lausanne became his principal bases for the rest of his career.

Stueckelberg's sojourn in Zurich led to contact with leading quantum theorists Wolfgang Pauli and Gregor Wentzel, which in turn led him to focus on the emerging theory of elementary particles.

In 1934, he devised a fully Lorentz-covariant perturbation theory for quantum fields. The approach proposed by Stueckelberg was very powerful, but was not adopted by others at the time, and has now been all but forgotten. However, besides being explicitly covariant, Stueckelberg's methods avoid vacuum bubbles.

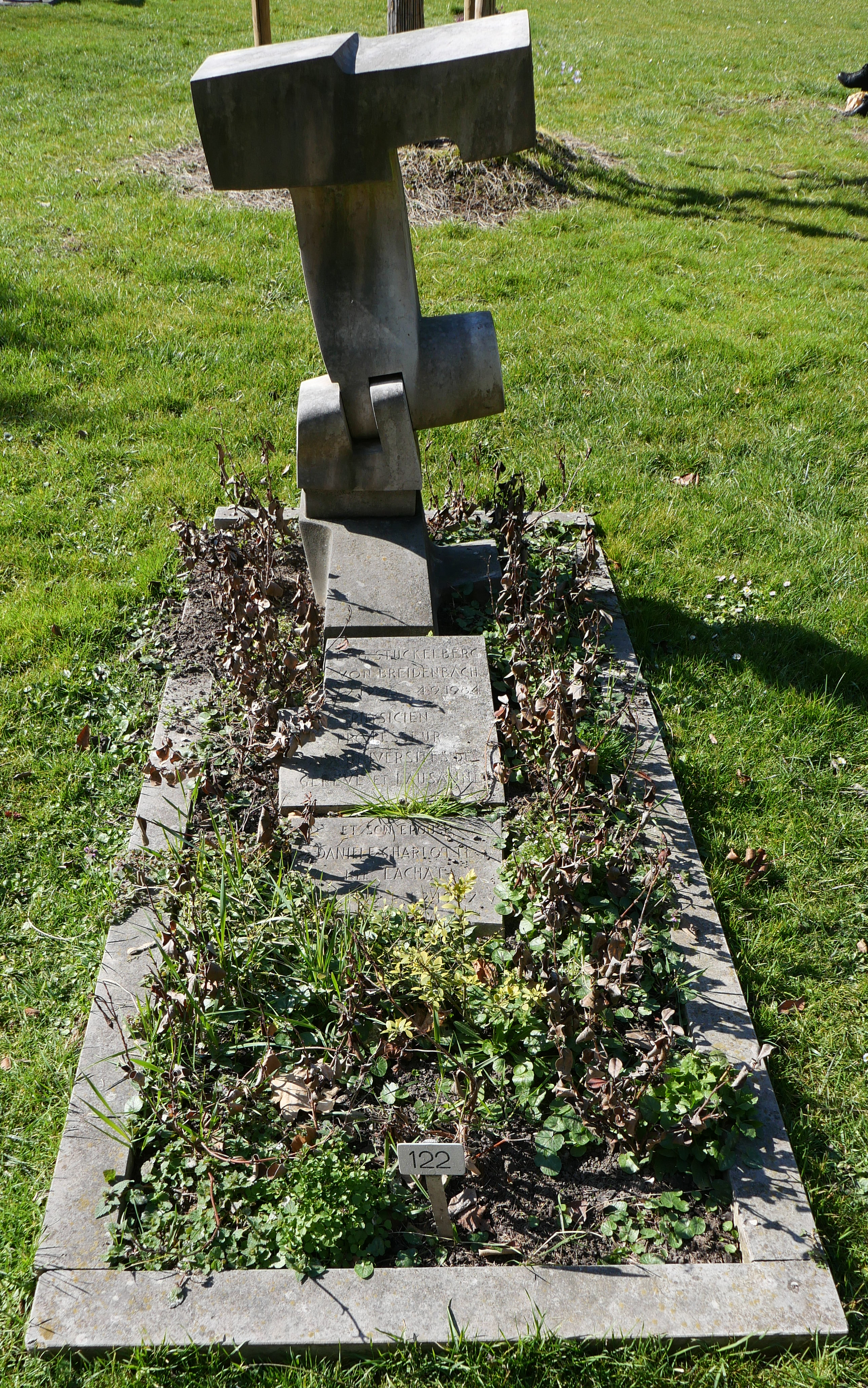
Stueckelberg's grave

Stueckelberg developed the vector boson exchange force model as the theoretical explanation of the strong nuclear force in 1935. Discussions with Pauli led Stueckelberg to drop the idea, however. Hideki Yukawa's independent development of this interaction theory won him the Nobel Prize in Physics in 1949.

In 1938, Stueckelberg recognized that massive electrodynamics contains a hidden scalar, and formulated an affine version of what would become known as the Abelian Higgs mechanism. He also proposed the law of conservation of baryon number.

The evolution parameter theory he presented in 1941 and 1942 is the basis for recent work in relativistic dynamics.

In 1941, he proposed the interpretation of the positron as a positive energy electron traveling backward in time.

In 1943, he came up with a renormalization program to attack the problems of infinities in quantum electrodynamics (QED), but his paper was rejected by the Physical Review.

In 1952, he proved the principle of semi-detailed balance for kinetics without microscopic reversibility.

In 1953, he and the mathematician André Petermann discovered the renormalization group.

Stueckelberg published two papers using CERN as his affiliation in 1972.

His PhD students included Marcel Guénin.

== Awards and honors ==
In 1976, he was awarded the Max Planck medal.

Stueckelberg is buried at the Cimetière des Rois (Cemetery of Kings), which is considered the Genevan Panthéon.

In 2017, the European Physical Society declared the Bastions building of the University of Geneva as an EPS Historic Site in honor of the scientific achievements made by Stueckelberg and Charles-Eugene Guye in this building.

There is a street, Route Stueckelberg, named after Stueckelberg at CERN, Prévessin, France.

== In literature ==
Mentioned as an underestimated scientist in The Passenger by the American writer Cormac McCarthy.

== See also ==
- Timeline of atomic and subatomic physics
- Propagator
- Relativistic dynamics
- Stueckelberg action
- Stueckelberg-Feynman interpretation
