= André Petermann =

Swiss theoretical physicist (1922–2011)

- Petermann in 1954
- Born: Andreas Emil Petermann; September 27, 1922; Lausanne, Switzerland
- Died: August 21, 2011 (aged 88); Lausanne, Switzerland
- Education: University of Lausanne
- Known for: Renormalization group Beta function
- Scientific career
- Fields: Theoretical physics
- Thesis: La normalisation des constantes dans la théorie des quanta (1952)
- Doctoral advisor: Ernst Stueckelberg

Andreas Emil Petermann (27 September 1922– 21 August 2011), known as André Petermann, was a Swiss theoretical physicist known for introducing the renormalization group, suggesting a quark-like model, and work related to the anomalous magnetic dipole moment of the muon.

Petermann obtained his doctorate from the University of Lausanne in May 1952 under the supervision of professor Ernst Stueckelberg. The work was funded by the Swiss Atomic Energy Commission. Following Lausanne, Petermann moved on to the University of Manchester, UK, before he became a CERN staff member in 1955. The CERN Theory Division was at that time still hosted at the University of Copenhagen. It was then moved to Geneva together with the CERN experimental groups in 1957.

== Work ==
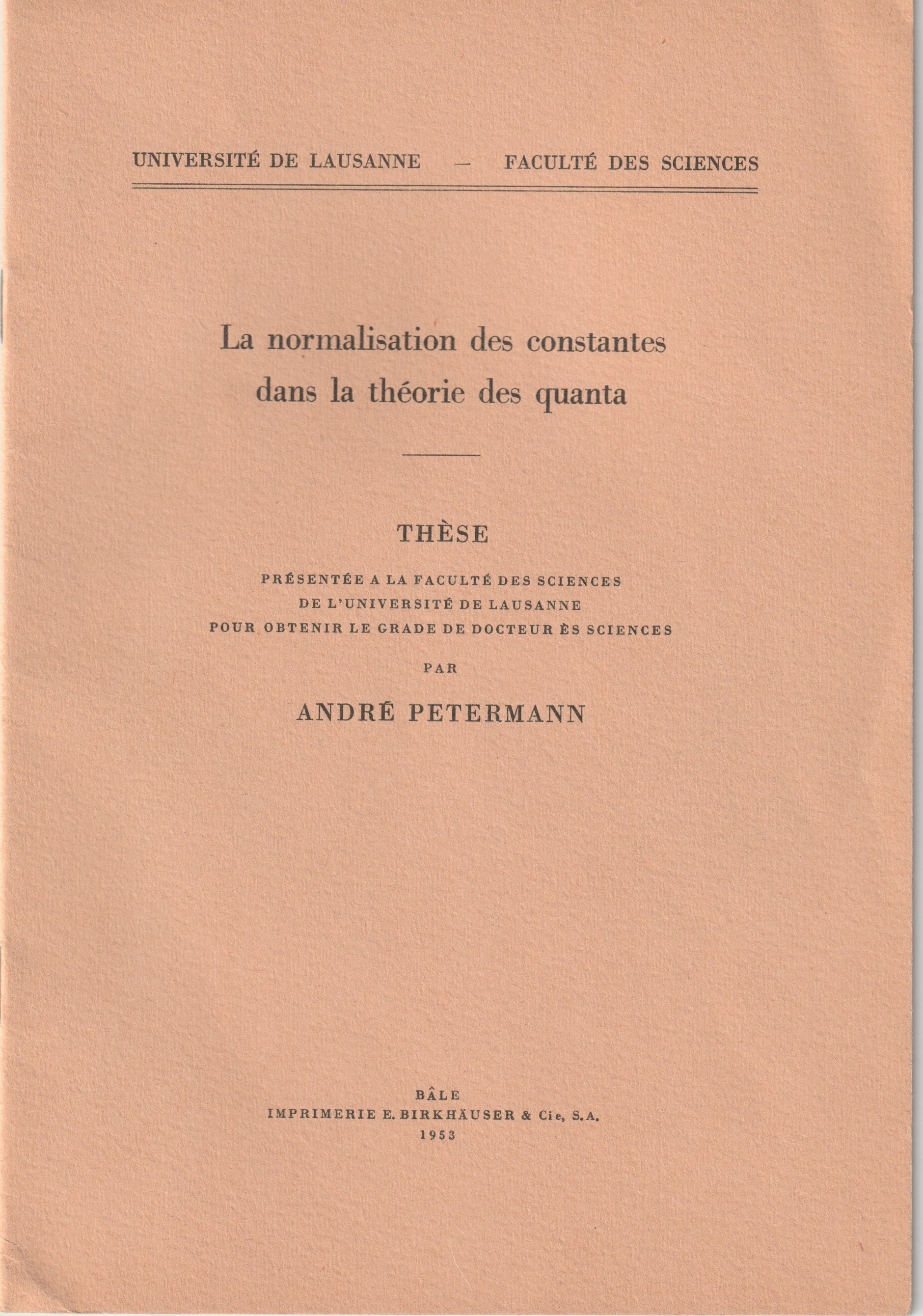
Facsimile of the cover page of André Petermann's doctoral dissertation "La normalisation des constantes dans la théorie des quanta", University of Lausanne, 1952.

Jointly with his advisor, Ernst Stueckelberg, in 1953, they introduced, and named the "renormalization group", which describes the running of physical couplings with energy. He also, apparently independently, considered the idea of quarks, albeit in a highly abstract, speculative form. Petermann submitted a four-page paper entitled "Propriétés de l'étrangeté et une formule de masse pour les mésons vectoriels" to the journal Nuclear Physics, which received the paper on 30 December 1963, but did not publish the article before March 1965. In this paper Petermann discusses what has become known as quarks as named by Murray Gell-Mann, whose Physics Letters publication was submitted during the first days of January 1964, and "aces" as named by George Zweig, who wrote two CERN-TH preprints slightly later in 1964.

Petermann is also remembered for his pioneering calculation of the next-to-leading order correction to the anomalous magnetic dipole moment of the muon.

Petermann was not consistent when signing his scientific papers; in the beginning of his career he used Petermann, then Peterman and later he alternated between the two forms. A list of his works can be found in the INSPIRE-HEP Literature Database .
