= Free field =

Physical field theory with no forces/interactions

In physics a free field is a field without interactions, which is described by the terms of motion and mass.

== Description ==
In classical physics, a free field is a field whose equations of motion are given by linear partial differential equations. Such linear PDE's have a unique solution for a given initial condition.

In quantum field theory, an operator valued distribution is a free field if it satisfies some linear partial differential equations such that the corresponding case of the same linear PDEs for a classical field (i.e. not an operator) would be the Euler–Lagrange equation for some quadratic Lagrangian. They are used to describe the non-interacting behavior of fields. We can differentiate distributions by defining their derivatives via differentiated test functions. See Schwartz distribution for more details. Since we are dealing not with ordinary distributions but operator valued distributions, it is understood these PDEs aren't constraints on states but instead a description of the relations among the smeared fields. Beside the PDEs, the operators also satisfy another relation, the commutation/anticommutation relations.

== Canonical commutation relation ==
Basically, commutator (for bosons)/anticommutator (for fermions) of two smeared fields is i times the Peierls bracket of the field with itself (which is really a distribution, not a function) for the PDEs smeared over both test functions. This has the form of a CCR/CAR algebra.

CCR/CAR algebras with infinitely many degrees of freedom have many inequivalent irreducible unitary representations. If the theory is defined over Minkowski space, we may choose the unitary irrep containing a vacuum state although that isn't always necessary.

== Example ==
=== Equations ===
The following are equations of motion for different spin fields and particles.

==== Klein-Gordon Equation ====
Let $\phi$ be a spin 0 field / particle. Then the equation of motion that describes its free motion is the Klein-Gordon equation. It is given by

$\partial^\mu \partial_\mu\phi +m^2\phi = 0$

==== Dirac Equation ====
The Dirac equation describes the free motion of a spin $\frac{1}{2}$ field / particle. It is given by

$(i\gamma_\mu\partial^\mu -m)\Psi = 0$

==== Proca Equations ====
The Proca equations are a set of equations of motion that describe the free of motion of spin 1 fields / particles. They are given by $m^2A^\rho=\frac{1}{2}\partial_\sigma(\partial^\sigma A^\rho-\partial^\rho A^\sigma)$

or

$0=\frac{1}{2}\partial_\sigma(\partial^\sigma A^\rho-\partial^\rho A^\sigma)$

depending if the spin 1 field / particle, $A^\mu$, is massless or not.

=== Operators on Free Fields ===
Let φ be an operator valued distribution and the (Klein–Gordon) PDE be

$$\partial^\mu \partial_\mu \phi+m^2 \phi=0$$.

This is a bosonic field. Let's call the distribution given by the Peierls bracket Δ.

Then,

$$\{\phi(x),\phi(y)\}=\Delta(x;y)$$

where here, φ is a classical field and {,} is the Peierls bracket.

Then, the canonical commutation relation is

$$[\phi[f],\phi[g]]=i\Delta[f,g] \,$$.

Note that Δ is a distribution over two arguments, and so, can be smeared as well.

Equivalently, we could have insisted that

$$\mathcal{T}\{[((\partial^\mu \partial_\mu+m^2)\phi)[f],\phi[g]]\}=-i\int d^dx f(x)g(x)$$

where $\mathcal{T}$ is the time ordering operator and that if the supports of f and g are spacelike separated,

$$[\phi[f],\phi[g]]=0$$.

== See also ==
- Normal order
- Wick's theorem
