= Robert Retherford =

American physicist (1912–1981)

Robert Curtis Retherford
- Born: 1912
- Died: 1981 (aged 68–69)
- Citizenship: United States
- Education: Columbia University
- Known for: Lamb shift
- Scientific career
- Fields: Physics
- Workplaces: Columbia University
- Doctoral advisor: Willis Lamb

Robert Curtis Retherford (1912–1981) was an American physicist. He was a graduate student of Willis Lamb at Columbia Radiation Laboratory. Retherford and Lamb performed the famous experiment (now known as the Lamb–Retherford experiment) revealing Lamb shift in the fine structure of hydrogen, a decisive experimental step toward a new understanding of quantum electrodynamics.

== See also ==
- Quantum electrodynamics
- Lamb shift
