= Mass generation =

Physics theory about the origin of mass

In theoretical physics, a mass generation mechanism is a theory that describes the origin of mass from the most fundamental laws of physics. Physicists have proposed a number of models that advocate different views of the origin of mass. The problem is complicated because the primary role of mass is to mediate gravitational interaction between bodies, and no theory of gravitational interaction reconciles with the currently popular Standard Model of particle physics.

There are two types of mass generation models: gravity-free models and models that involve gravity.

== Background ==
=== Quantum chromodynamics ===
Most of the mass of ordinary matter is generated by the strong nuclear force, described by quantum chromodynamics (QCD). Inside protons and neutrons, quarks are permanently confined by gluons, the particles that carry the strong force. The quarks move at nearly the speed of light and are immersed in intense gluon fields and a constantly fluctuating sea of virtual quark-antiquark pairs. The enormous energy associated with this confined motion and these strong-force fields contributes to the mass of the proton and neutron according to Einstein's mass–energy relation E=mc^{2}. Thus, the vast majority of the mass of the visible Universe is the energy of confined quarks and gluons expressed as mass.

=== Electroweak theory and the Standard Model ===
The Higgs mechanism is based on a symmetry-breaking scalar field potential, such as the quartic. The Standard Model uses this mechanism as part of the Glashow–Weinberg–Salam model to unify electromagnetic and weak interactions. This model was one of several that predicted the existence of the scalar Higgs boson.

== Gravity-free models ==
In these theories, as in the Standard Model itself, the gravitational interaction either is not involved or does not play a crucial role.

=== Technicolor ===
Technicolor models break electroweak symmetry through gauge interactions, which were originally modeled on quantum chromodynamics.

=== Coleman-Weinberg mechanism ===
Coleman–Weinberg mechanism generates mass through spontaneous symmetry breaking.

=== Other theories ===
- Unparticle physics and the unhiggs models posit that the Higgs sector and Higgs boson are scaling invariant.
- UV-Completion by Classicalization, in which the unitarization of the WW scattering happens by creation of classical configurations.
- Symmetry breaking driven by non-equilibrium dynamics of quantum fields above the electroweak scale.
- Asymptotically safe weak interactions based on some nonlinear sigma models.
- Models of composite W and Z vector bosons.
- Top quark condensate.

== Gravitational models ==
- Extra-dimensional Higgsless models use the fifth component of the gauge fields in place of the Higgs fields. It is possible to produce electroweak symmetry breaking by imposing certain boundary conditions on the extra dimensional fields, increasing the unitarity breakdown scale up to the energy scale of the extra dimension. Through the AdS/QCD correspondence this model can be related to technicolor models and to UnHiggs models, in which the Higgs field is of unparticle nature.
- Unitary Weyl gauge. If one adds a suitable gravitational term to the standard model action with gravitational coupling, the theory becomes locally scale-invariant (i.e. Weyl-invariant) in the unitary gauge for the local SU(2). Weyl transformations act multiplicatively on the Higgs field, so one can fix the Weyl gauge by requiring that the Higgs scalar be a constant.
- Preon and models inspired by preons such as the Ribbon model of Standard Model particles by Sundance Bilson-Thompson, based in braid theory and compatible with loop quantum gravity and similar theories. This model not only explains the origin of mass, but also interprets electric charge as a topological quantity (twists carried on the individual ribbons), and colour charge as modes of twisting.
- In the theory of superfluid vacuum, masses of elementary particles arise from interaction with a physical vacuum, similarly to the gap generation mechanism in superfluids. The low-energy limit of this theory suggests an effective potential for the Higgs sector that is different from the Standard Model's, yet it yields the mass generation. Under certain conditions, this potential gives rise to an elementary particle with a role and characteristics similar to the Higgs boson.
