= Higgs pair production =

Particle physics process

Higgs boson pair production, also known as di-Higgs production (HH), is a process in particle physics regarding the self-interactions of the Higgs boson. This process is essential for testing the structure of the Higgs potential and the mechanism of electroweak symmetry breaking (EWSB).

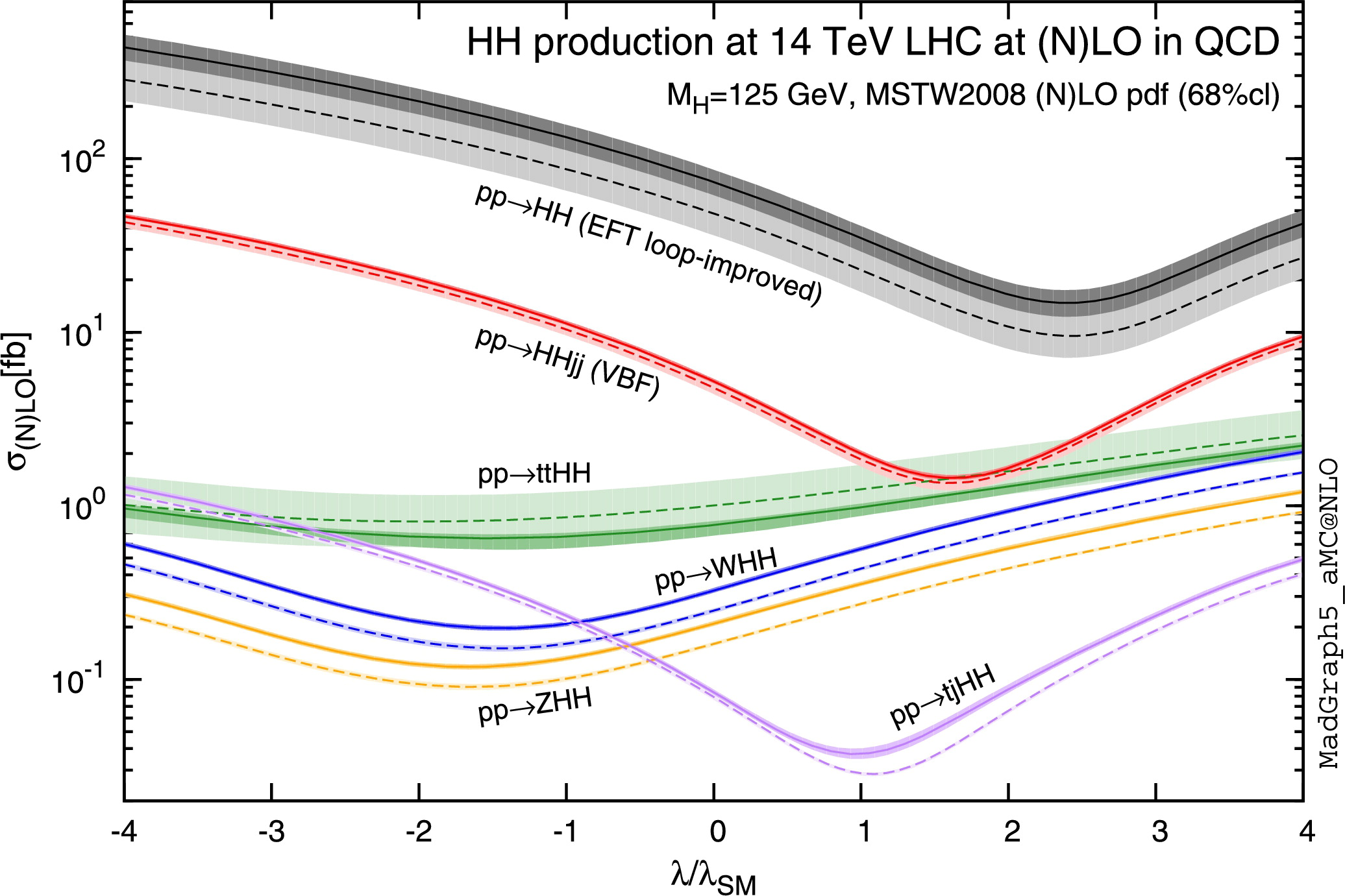
Total cross sections at the LO and NLO in QCD for HH production channels, at the LHC as a function of the self-interaction coupling λ.

== Motivation ==
After the Higgs boson was discovered in 2012, research efforts focused on exploring its interactions with other particles. While many of these couplings have been measured, the Higgs boson's self-coupling remains unmeasured. The shape of the Higgs potential in the Standard Model (SM) includes both trilinear and quartic self-couplings, which are key to understanding the nature of the Higgs field and EWSB.

The Higgs potential in the SM is described as:

$$V_\text{H} = \frac{1}{2} {m_\text{H}}^2 H^2 + \lambda_\text{HHH} H^3 + \lambda_\text{HHHH} H^4$$

where $m_\text{H}$ is the Higgs boson mass, and $\lambda_\text{HHH}$ and $\lambda_\text{HHHH}$ are the trilinear and quartic self-couplings. Precise measurements of these parameters could also indicate the presence of beyond the Standard Model (BSM) physics.

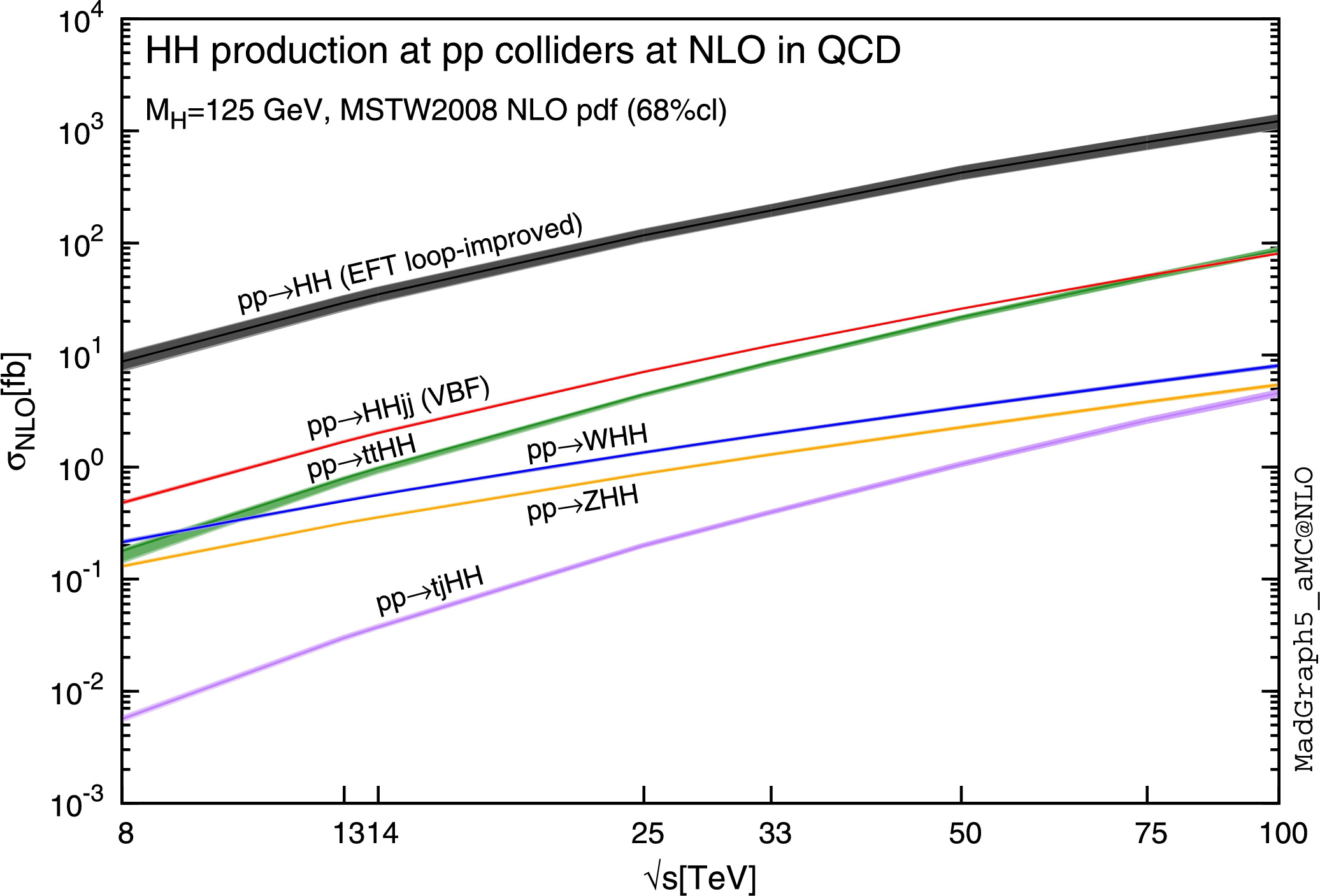
Total cross sections at the NLO in QCD for the six largest HH production channels at pp colliders. The thickness of the lines corresponds to the scale and PDF uncertainties added linearly.

== Production mechanisms at the LHC ==
At the Large Hadron Collider (LHC), Higgs boson pairs can be produced through several mechanisms:

- Gluon–gluon fusion (ggF), the dominant production mode, proceeds via heavy quark loops (primarily top quarks) and involves both box and triangle Feynman diagrams. Interference between these diagrams plays a significant role.
- Vector boson fusion (VBF), where Higgs bosons are radiated from virtual W or Z bosons exchanged between quarks.
- Associated production with top quark pairs (ttHH) or vector bosons (VHH), which become more relevant at higher center-of-mass energies.

Each mechanism provides different sensitivity to the Higgs self-coupling. For example, the triangle diagram in ggF directly involves the trilinear coupling.

== Decay channels ==
Higgs boson pairs can decay through various channels. The most experimentally sensitive final states include:

- HH → bb̅bb̅: Has the highest branching fraction (~34%) but suffers from large QCD backgrounds.
- HH → bb̅γγ: Low branching fraction (~0.3%) but excellent mass resolution due to clean photon identification.
- HH → bb̅τ^{+}τ^{−}: Offers a good compromise between signal rate and background contamination (~7.3% branching fraction).
- Multilepton final states: Events with two or more leptons from bb̅ZZ, 4V (WWWW, WWZZ, ZZZZ), VVττ, 4τ, γγVV, and γγττ decays, with clean lepton signatures providing good background rejection despite moderate branching fractions (~6.5% combined).
- HH → bb̅ℓℓ+E_{T}^{miss}: Semileptonic final states with contributions from bb̅WW, bb̅ZZ, and bb̅ττ decays. Lower backgrounds than fully hadronic modes with reasonable branching fractions.

Different channels provide complementary sensitivity to the HH signal.

== Experimental status ==
Higgs boson pair production has not yet been observed at the LHC. The Standard Model predicts a small cross-section for non-resonant HH production via gluon–gluon fusion, approximately 31 fb at a center-of-mass energy of 13 TeV. This small rate, coupled with large backgrounds in most decay channels, makes the search experimentally challenging.

=== Higgs self-coupling constraints ===
The Higgs self-coupling $\lambda_\text{HHH}$ directly affects the triangle diagram in ggF production and the t-diagram in VBF production. Experimental results place constraints on this coupling by measuring deviations in the total cross-section and kinematic distributions. Current constraints from global combinations of decay channels show that the self-coupling value $\kappa_\lambda = \lambda_\text{HHH} / \lambda_\text{HHH}^{\text{SM}}$ is within experimental error of the SM value.

=== Future prospects ===
The upcoming High Luminosity Large Hadron Collider (HL-LHC), expected to deliver up to 3 ab^{−1} of data at √s = 14 TeV, will significantly improve the sensitivity to HH production. The most recent combined ATLAS and CMS projections, prepared as input for the 2026 European Strategy for Particle Physics Update, suggest:

- Discovery of SM non-resonant HH production with a combined significance exceeding 7σ,
- Discovery threshold (5σ) reached with 2 ab^{−1} of combined data from both experiments,
- A measurement of $\kappa_\lambda$ with better than 30% precision,
- Discovery potential in certain BSM scenarios (e.g., enhanced self-coupling or new resonances decaying to HH).

These projections are a significant improvement over the previous 2019 European Strategy Update, which projected a significance of 4σ, below the discovery level. These improvements are driven by new graph-based architectures for deep learning-based jet tagging that have improved identification of H → bb̅ and H → τ^{+}τ^{−} decays across the full Higgs boson p_{T} spectrum, including boosted topologies where decay products overlap. Improved b-tagging algorithms also contribute to the enhanced sensitivity. The updated HL-LHC projections also include sensitivity from additional channels such as multilepton final states (with two or more leptons) and bb̅ℓℓ+E_{T}^{miss}, which were not included in the 2019 estimates.

Future hadron colliders such as the FCC-hh (100 TeV) could achieve percent-level precision on $\lambda_\text{HHH}$ and may enable observation of triple Higgs boson production (HHH), directly constraining the quartic Higgs self-coupling $\lambda_{\text{HHHH}}$.

=== Resonant searches ===
Searches for heavy particles decaying into Higgs boson pairs (resonant HH production) are also ongoing. Such signals could arise from new scalar bosons or Kaluza–Klein gravitons in BSM models. Mass ranges from a few hundred GeV to several TeV have been explored, with no significant excess observed so far.

== See also ==
- Electroweak symmetry breaking
- Standard Model
- Effective field theory
