= History of subatomic physics =

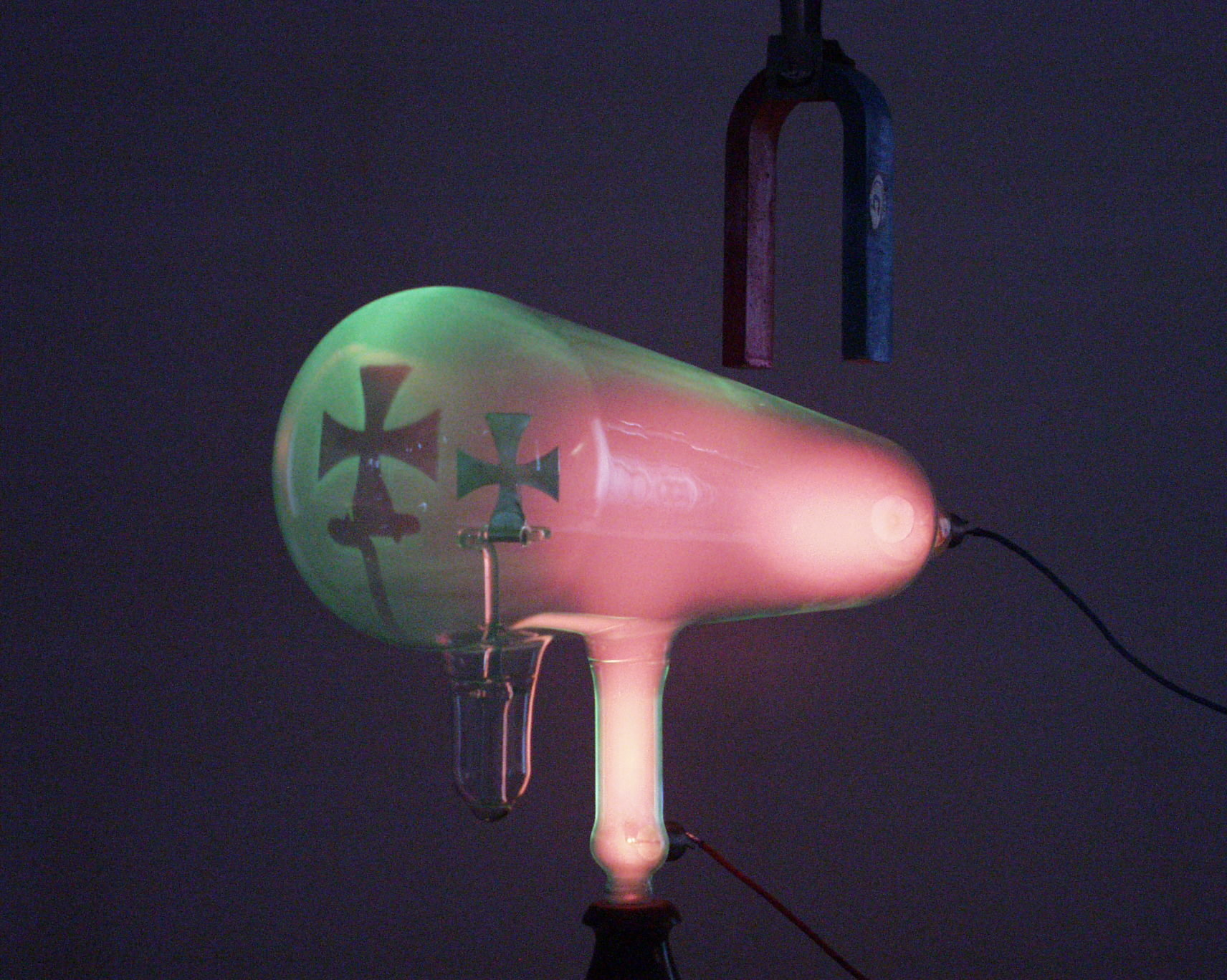
A Crookes tube with a magnetic deflector

The idea that matter consists of smaller particles and that there exists a limited number of sorts of primary, smallest particles in nature has existed in natural philosophy at least since the 6th century BC. Such ideas gained physical credibility beginning in the 19th century, but the concept of "elementary particle" underwent some changes in its meaning: notably, modern physics no longer deems elementary particles indestructible. Even elementary particles can decay or collide destructively; they can cease to exist and create (other) particles in result.

Increasingly small particles have been discovered and researched: they include molecules, which are constructed of atoms, that in turn consist of subatomic particles, namely atomic nuclei and electrons. Many more types of subatomic particles have been found. Most such particles (but not electrons) were eventually found to be composed of even smaller particles such as quarks. Particle physics studies these smallest particles; nuclear physics studies atomic nuclei and their (immediate) constituents: protons and neutrons.

== Early development ==
The idea that all matter is composed of elementary particles dates to as far as the 6th century BCE. The Jains in ancient India were the earliest to advocate the particular nature of material objects between 9th and 5th century BCE. According to Jain leaders like Parshvanatha and Mahavira, the ajiva (non living part of universe) consists of matter or pudgala, of definite or indefinite shape which is made up tiny uncountable and invisible particles called permanu. Permanu occupies space-point and each permanu has definite colour, smell, taste and texture. Infinite varieties of permanu unite and form pudgala. The philosophical doctrine of atomism and the nature of elementary particles were also studied by ancient Greek philosophers such as Leucippus, Democritus, and Epicurus; ancient Indian philosophers such as Kanada, Dignāga, and Dharmakirti; Muslim scientists such as Ibn al-Haytham, Ibn Sina, and Mohammad al-Ghazali; and in early modern Europe by physicists such as Pierre Gassendi, Robert Boyle, and Isaac Newton. The particle theory of light was also proposed by Ibn al-Haytham, Ibn Sina, Gassendi, and Newton.

Those early ideas were founded through abstract, philosophical reasoning rather than experimentation and empirical observation and represented only one line of thought among many. In contrast, certain ideas of Gottfried Wilhelm Leibniz (see Monadology) contradict to almost everything known in modern physics.

In the 19th century, John Dalton, through his work on stoichiometry, concluded that each chemical element was composed of a single, unique type of particle. Dalton and his contemporaries believed those were the fundamental particles of nature and thus named them atoms, after the Greek word atomos, meaning "indivisible" or "uncut". However, near the end of 19th century, physicists discovered that Dalton's atoms are not, in fact, the fundamental particles of nature, but conglomerates of even smaller particles.

== From atoms to nucleons ==
=== Electromagnetic theory ===
Throughout the 1800s scientists explored many phenomena of electricity and magnetism, culminating in an accurate theory by James Clerk Maxwell. This theory was a continuous field model developed around the ideas of luminiferous aether. When no experiment could produce evidence of such an ether, and in view of the growing evidence supporting the atomic model, Hendrik Antoon Lorentz developed a theory of electromagnetism based on "ions" that reproduced Maxwell's model.

=== Discovery of the electron ===
The electron was discovered in 1899 by J. J. Thomson, building on his own work and the works of Walter Kaufmann, Emil Wiechert, and other physicists. Thomson measured the electron charge to mass ratio using crossed electric and magnetic fields and the electron charge using a cloud chamber, newly discovered by his student CTR Wilson. This combination gave the first estimate of the electron mass. Physicists theorized that negatively charged electrons are constituent part of "atoms", along with some (yet unknown) positively charged substance, and it was later confirmed. Electron became the first elementary, truly fundamental particle discovered.

=== Radioactivity ===
Studies of the "radioactivity", that soon revealed the phenomenon of radioactive decay, provided another argument against considering chemical elements as fundamental nature's elements. Despite these discoveries, the term atom stuck to Dalton's (chemical) atoms and now denotes the smallest particle of a chemical element, not something really indivisible.

=== Researching particles' interaction ===
Early 20th-century physicists knew only two fundamental forces: electromagnetism and gravitation, where the latter could not explain the structure of atoms. So, it was obvious to assume that unknown positively charged substance attracts electrons by Coulomb force.

In 1909 Ernest Rutherford and Thomas Royds demonstrated that an alpha particle combines with two electrons and forms a helium atom. In modern terms, alpha particles are doubly ionized helium (more precisely, ^{4}He) atoms. Speculation about the structure of atoms was severely constrained by Rutherford's 1907 gold foil experiment, showing that the atom is mainly empty space, with almost all its mass concentrated in a tiny atomic nucleus.

=== Inside the atom ===
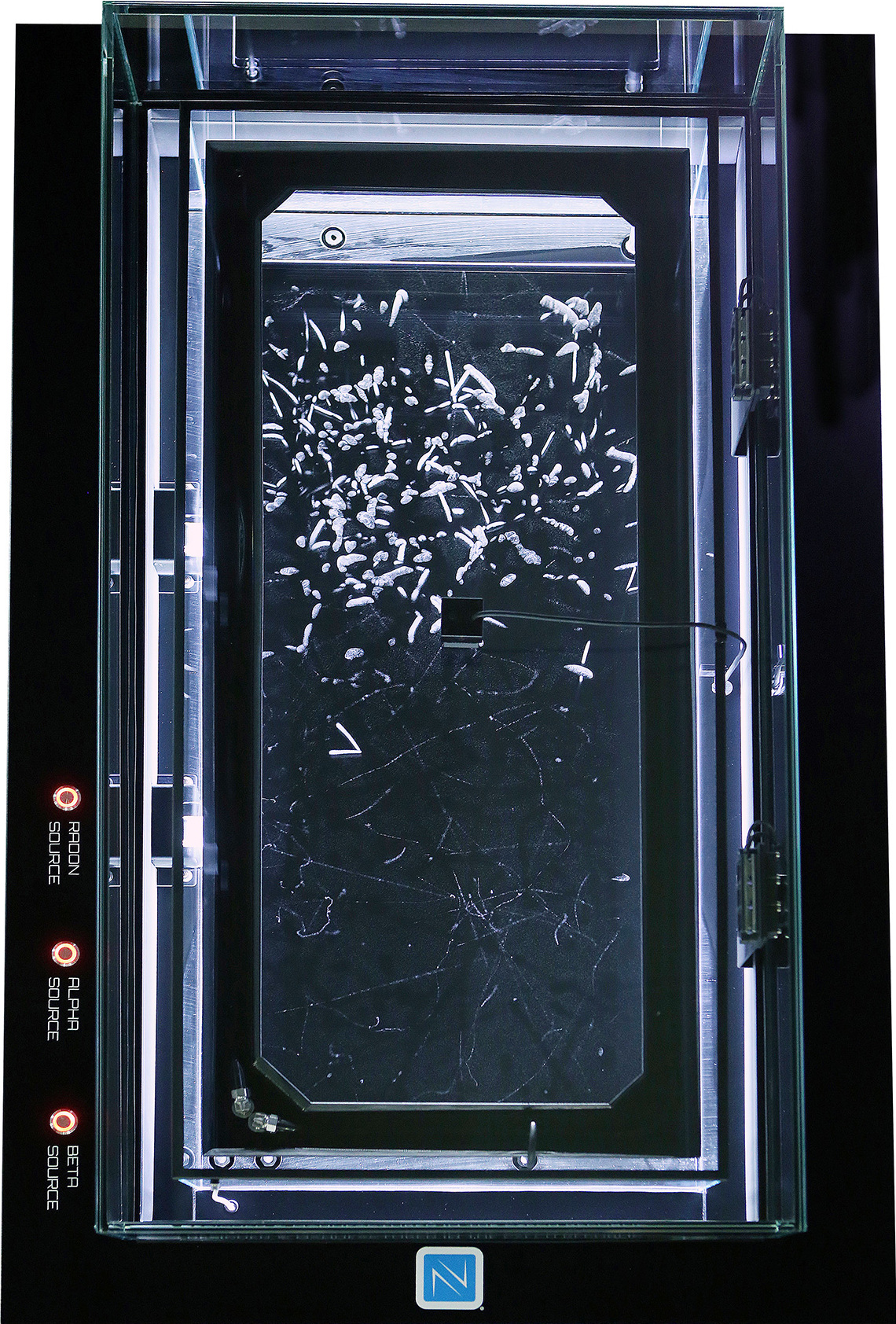
Cloud chambers played an important role as particle detectors in the early days of subatomic physics. Some particles including the positron were even discovered by using this device

In 1913, Dutch amateur physicist Antonius van den Broek proposed that the elements should be ordered by their positive charge of its atomic nucleus rather than by their atomic weight. This hypothesis agreed with Mendeleev's periodic arrangement and was experimentally verified in 1913 by Henry Moseley using X-ray spectroscopy.

By 1914, experiments by Ernest Rutherford, Henry Moseley, James Franck and Gustav Hertz and the quantum atom theory of Niels Bohr had largely established the structure of an atom as a dense nucleus of positive charge surrounded by lower-mass electrons. These discoveries shed a light to the nature of radioactive decay and other forms of transmutation of elements, as well as of elements themselves. It appeared that atomic number is nothing else than (positive) electric charge of the atomic nucleus of a particular atom. Chemical transformations, governed by electromagnetic interactions, do not change nuclei – that's why elements are chemically indestructible. But when the nucleus changes its charge and/or mass (by emitting or capturing a particle), the atom can become the one of another element. Special relativity explained how the mass defect is related to the energy produced or consumed in reactions. The branch of physics that studies transformations and the structure of nuclei is now called nuclear physics, contrasted to atomic physics that studies the structure and properties of atoms ignoring most nuclear aspects. The development in the nascent quantum physics, such as Bohr model, led to the understanding of chemistry in terms of the arrangement of electrons in the mostly empty volume of atoms.

In 1918, Rutherford confirmed that the hydrogen nucleus was a particle with a positive charge, which he named the proton. By then, Frederick Soddy's researches of radioactive elements, and experiments of J. J. Thomson and F.W. Aston conclusively demonstrated existence of isotopes, whose nuclei have different masses in spite of identical atomic numbers. It prompted Rutherford to conjecture that all nuclei other than hydrogen contain chargeless particles, which he named the neutron. Evidences that atomic nuclei consist of some smaller particles (now called nucleons) grew; it became obvious that, while protons repulse each other electrostatically, nucleons attract each other by some new force (nuclear force). It culminated in proofs of nuclear fission in 1939 by Lise Meitner (based on experiments by Otto Hahn), and nuclear fusion by Hans Bethe in that same year. Those discoveries gave rise to an active industry of generating one atom from another, even rendering possible (although it will probably never be profitable) the transmutation of lead into gold; and, those same discoveries also led to the development of nuclear weapons.

== Revelations of quantum mechanics ==
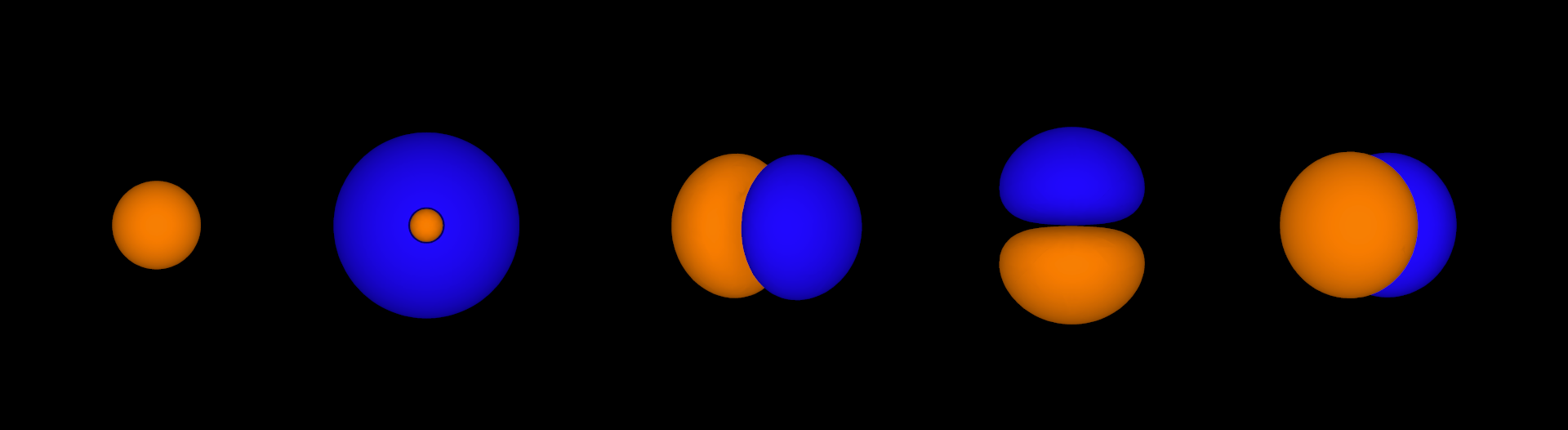
Atomic orbitals of period 2 elements: 1s 2s 2p (3 items). All complete subshells (including 2p) are inherently spherically symmetric, but it is convenient to assign to "distinct" p-electrons these two-lobed shapes.

Further understanding of atomic and nuclear structures became impossible without improving the knowledge about the essence of particles. Experiments and improved theories (such as Erwin Schrödinger's "electron waves") gradually revealed that there is no fundamental difference between particles and waves. For example, electromagnetic waves were reformulated in terms of particles called photons. It also revealed that physical objects do not change their parameters, such as total energy, position and momentum, as continuous functions of time, as it was thought of in classical physics: see atomic electron transition for example.

Another crucial discovery was identical particles or, more generally, quantum particle statistics. It was established that all electrons are identical: although two or more electrons can exist simultaneously that have different parameters, but they do not keep separate, distinguishable histories. This also applies to protons, neutrons, and (with certain differences) to photons as well. It suggested that there is a limited number of sorts of smallest particles in the universe.

The spin–statistics theorem established that any particle in our spacetime may be either a boson (that means its statistics is Bose–Einstein) or a fermion (that means its statistics is Fermi–Dirac). It was later found that all fundamental bosons transmit forces, like the photon that transmits light. Some of non-fundamental bosons (namely, mesons) also may transmit forces (see below), although non-fundamental ones. Fermions are particles "like electrons and nucleons" and generally comprise the matter. Note that any subatomic or atomic particle composed of even total number of fermions (such as protons, neutrons, and electrons) is a boson, so a boson is not necessarily a force transmitter and perfectly can be an ordinary material particle.

The spin is the quantity that distinguishes bosons and fermions. Practically it appears as an intrinsic angular momentum of a particle, that is unrelated to its motion but is linked with some other features like a magnetic dipole. Theoretically it is explained from different types representations of symmetry groups, namely tensor representations (including vectors and scalars) for bosons with their integer (in ħ) spins, and spinor representations for fermions with their half-integer spins.

Improved understanding of the world of particles prompted physicists to make bold predictions, such as Dirac's positron in 1928 (founded on the Dirac Sea model) and Pauli's neutrino in 1930 (founded on conservation of energy and angular momentum in beta decay). Both were later confirmed.

This culminated in the formulation of ideas of a quantum field theory. The first (and the only mathematically complete) of these theories, quantum electrodynamics, allowed to explain thoroughly the structure of atoms, including the Periodic Table and atomic spectra. Ideas of quantum mechanics and quantum field theory were applied to nuclear physics too. For example, α decay was explained as a quantum tunneling through nuclear potential, nucleons' fermionic statistics explained the nucleon pairing, and Hideki Yukawa proposed certain virtual particles (now knows as π-mesons) as an explanation of the nuclear force.

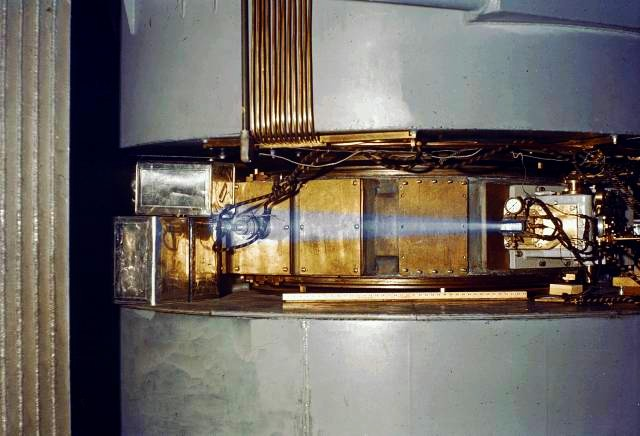

== From nuclides to nuclear engineering ==
Development of nuclear models (such as the liquid-drop model and nuclear shell model) made prediction of properties of nuclides possible. No existing model of nucleon–nucleon interaction can analytically compute something more complex than ^{4}He based on principles of quantum mechanics, though (note that complete computation of electron shells in atoms is also impossible as yet).

The most developed branch of nuclear physics in 1940s was studies related to nuclear fission due to its military significance. The main focus of fission-related problems is interaction of atomic nuclei with neutrons: a process that occurs in a fission bomb and a nuclear fission reactor. It gradually drifted away from the rest of subatomic physics and virtually became the nuclear engineering. The first synthesised transuranium elements were also obtained in this context, through neutron capture and subsequent β^{−} decay.

The elements beyond fermium cannot be produced in this way. To make a nuclide with more than 100 protons per nucleus one has to use an inventory and methods of particle physics (see details below), namely to accelerate and collide atomic nuclei. Production of progressively heavier synthetic elements continued into 21st century as a branch of nuclear physics, but only for scientific purposes.

The third important stream in nuclear physics are researches related to nuclear fusion. This is related to thermonuclear weapons (and conceived peaceful thermonuclear energy), as well as to astrophysical researches, such as stellar nucleosynthesis and Big Bang nucleosynthesis.

== High energy physics ==
=== Strange particles and the weak interaction ===
In the 1950s, with development of particle accelerators and studies of cosmic rays, inelastic scattering experiments on protons (and other atomic nuclei) with energies about hundreds of MeVs became affordable. They created some short-lived resonance "particles", but also hyperons and K-mesons with unusually long lifetime. The cause of the latter was found in a new quasi-conserved quantity, named strangeness, that is conserved in all circumstances except for the weak interaction. The strangeness of heavy particles and the μ-lepton were first two signs of what is now known as the second generation of fundamental particles.

The weak interaction revealed soon yet another mystery. In 1957 Chien-Shiung Wu proved that it does not conserve parity. In other words, the mirror symmetry was disproved as a fundamental symmetry law.

Throughout the 1950s and 1960s, improvements in particle accelerators and particle detectors led to a bewildering variety of particles found in high-energy experiments. The term elementary particle came to refer to dozens of particles, most of them unstable. It prompted Wolfgang Pauli's remark: "Had I foreseen this, I would have gone into botany". The entire collection was nicknamed the "particle zoo". It became evident that some smaller constituents, yet invisible, form mesons and baryons that counted most of then-known particles.

=== Deeper constituents of matter ===
Classification of spin-3/2 baryons known in 1960s

The interaction of these particles by scattering and decay provided a key to new fundamental quantum theories. Murray Gell-Mann and Yuval Ne'eman brought some order to mesons and baryons, the most numerous classes of particles, by classifying them according to certain qualities. It began with what Gell-Mann referred to as the "Eightfold Way", but proceeding into several different "octets" and "decuplets" which could predict new particles, most famously the Ω^{−}, which was detected at Brookhaven National Laboratory in 1964, and which gave rise to the quark model of hadron composition. While the quark model at first seemed inadequate to describe strong nuclear forces, allowing the temporary rise of competing theories such as the S-matrix theory, the establishment of quantum chromodynamics in the 1970s finalized a set of fundamental and exchange particles. It postulated the fundamental strong interaction, experienced by quarks and mediated by gluons. These particles were proposed as a building material for hadrons (see hadronization). This theory is unusual because individual (free) quarks cannot be observed (see color confinement), unlike the situation with composite atoms where electrons and nuclei can be isolated by transferring ionization energy to the atom.

Then, the old, broad denotation of the term elementary particle was deprecated and a replacement term subatomic particle covered all the "zoo", with its hyponym "hadron" referring to composite particles directly explained by the quark model. The designation of an "elementary" (or "fundamental") particle was reserved for leptons, quarks, their antiparticles, and quanta of fundamental interactions (see below) only.

=== Quarks, leptons, and four fundamental forces ===
The Standard Model

Because the quantum field theory (see above) postulates no difference between particles and interactions, classification of elementary particles allowed also to classify interactions and fields.

Now a large number of particles and (non-fundamental) interactions is explained as combinations of a (relatively) small number of fundamental substances, thought to be fundamental interactions (incarnated in fundamental bosons), quarks (including antiparticles), and leptons (including antiparticles). As the theory distinguished several fundamental interactions, it became possible to see which elementary particles participate in which interaction. Namely:

- All particles participate in gravitation.
- All charged elementary particles participate in electromagnetic interaction.
  - As a consequence, neutron participates in it with its magnetic dipole in spite of zero electric charge. This is because it is composed of charged quarks whose charges sum to zero.
- All fermions participate in the weak interaction.
- Quarks participate in the strong interaction, along gluons (its own quanta), but not leptons nor any fundamental bosons other than gluons.

The next step was a reduction in number of fundamental interactions, envisaged by early 20th century physicists as the "united field theory". The first successful modern unified theory was the electroweak theory, developed by Abdus Salam, Steven Weinberg and, subsequently, Sheldon Glashow. This development culminated in the completion of the theory called the Standard Model in the 1970s, that included also the strong interaction, thus covering three fundamental forces. After the discovery, made at CERN, of the existence of neutral weak currents, mediated by the Z boson foreseen in the standard model, the physicists Salam, Glashow and Weinberg received the 1979 Nobel Prize in Physics for their electroweak theory. The discovery of the weak gauge bosons (quanta of the weak interaction) through the 1980s, and the verification of their properties through the 1990s is considered to be an age of consolidation in particle physics.

While accelerators have confirmed most aspects of the Standard Model by detecting expected particle interactions at various collision energies, no theory reconciling general relativity with the Standard Model has yet been found, although supersymmetry and string theory were believed by many theorists to be a promising avenue forward. The Large Hadron Collider, however, which began operating in 2008, has failed to find any evidence whatsoever that is supportive of supersymmetry and string theory, and appears unlikely to do so, meaning "the current situation in fundamental theory is one of a serious lack of any new ideas at all." This state of affairs should not be viewed as a crisis in physics, but rather, as David Gross has said, "the kind of acceptable scientific confusion that discovery eventually transcends."

Gravitation, the fourth fundamental interaction, is not yet integrated into particle physics in a consistent way.

=== Higgs boson ===
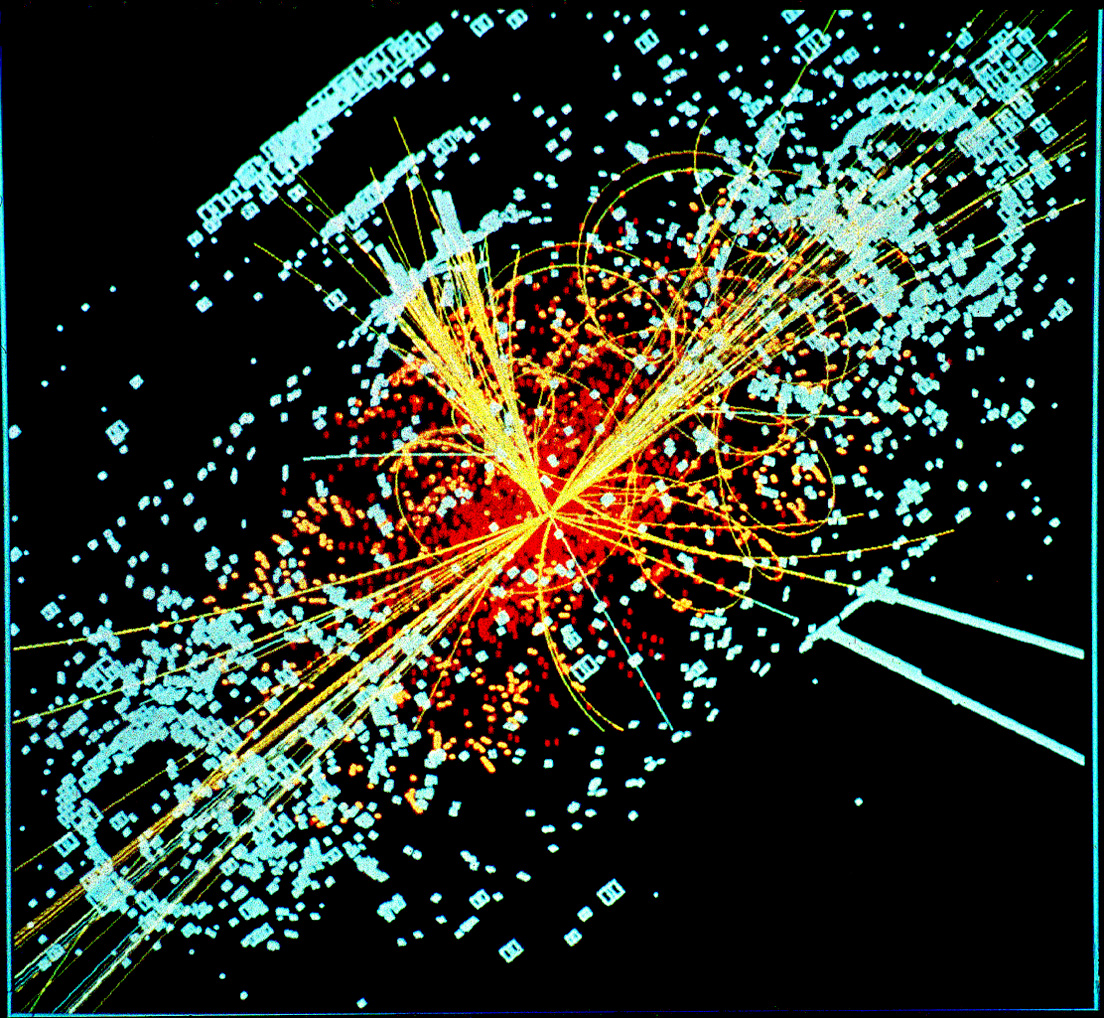
One possible signature of a Higgs boson from a simulated proton–proton collision. It decays almost immediately into two jets of hadrons and two electrons, visible as lines.

As of 2011, the Higgs boson, the quantum of a field that is thought to provide particles with rest masses, remained the only particle of the Standard Model to be verified. On July 4, 2012, physicists working at CERN's Large Hadron Collider announced that they had discovered a new subatomic particle greatly resembling the Higgs boson, a potential key to an understanding of why elementary particles have masses and indeed to the existence of diversity and life in the universe. Rolf-Dieter Heuer, the director general of CERN, said that it was too soon to know for sure whether it is an entirely new massive particle – one of the heaviest subatomic particles yet – or, indeed, the elusive particle predicted by the Standard Model, the theory that has ruled physics for the last half-century. It is unknown if this particle is an impostor, a single particle or even the first of many particles yet to be discovered. The latter possibilities are particularly exciting to physicists since they could point the way to new deeper ideas, beyond the Standard Model, about the nature of reality. For now, some physicists are calling it a "Higgslike" particle. Joe Incandela, of the University of California, Santa Barbara, said, "It's something that may, in the end, be one of the biggest observations of any new phenomena in our field in the last 30 or 40 years, going way back to the discovery of quarks, for example." The groups operating the large detectors in the collider said that the likelihood that their signal was a result of a chance fluctuation was less than one chance in 3.5 million, so-called "five sigma," which is the gold standard in physics for a discovery. Michael Turner, a cosmologist at the University of Chicago and the chairman of the physics center board, said

This is a big moment for particle physics and a crossroads — will this be the high water mark or will it be the first of many discoveries that point us toward solving the really big questions that we have posed?

— Michael Turner, University of Chicago

Confirmation of the Higgs boson or something very much like it would constitute a rendezvous with destiny for a generation of physicists who have believed the boson existed for half a century without ever seeing it. Further, it affirms a grand view of a universe ruled by simple and elegant and symmetrical laws, but in which everything interesting in it being a result of flaws or breaks in that symmetry. According to the Standard Model, the Higgs boson is the only visible and particular manifestation of an invisible force field that permeates space and imbues elementary particles that would otherwise be massless with mass. Without this Higgs field, or something like it, physicists say all the elementary forms of matter would zoom around at the speed of light; there would be neither atoms nor life. The Higgs boson achieved a notoriety rare for abstract physics. To the eternal dismay of his colleagues, Leon Lederman, the former director of Fermilab, called it the "God particle" in his book of the same name, later quipping that he had wanted to call it "the goddamn particle". Professor Incandela also stated,

This boson is a very profound thing we have found. We're reaching into the fabric of the universe at a level we've never done before. We've kind of completed one particle's story [...] We're on the frontier now, on the edge of a new exploration. This could be the only part of the story that's left, or we could open a whole new realm of discovery.

— Joe Incandela, University of California

Dr. Peter Higgs was one of six physicists, working in three independent groups, who in 1964 invented the notion of the cosmic molasses, or Higgs field. The others were Tom Kibble of Imperial College, London; Carl Hagen of the University of Rochester; Gerald Guralnik of Brown University; and François Englert and Robert Brout, both of Université Libre de Bruxelles. One implication of their theory was that this Higgs field would produce its own quantum particle if hit hard enough by the right amount of energy. The particle would be fragile and fall apart within a millionth of a second in a dozen different ways depending upon its own mass. Unfortunately, the theory did not predict the particle mass making it difficult to find. The particle eluded researchers at a succession of particle accelerators.

Further experiments continued and in March 2013 it was tentatively confirmed that the newly discovered particle was a Higgs Boson.

Although they have never been seen, Higgs-like fields play an important role in theories of the universe and in string theory. Under certain conditions, according to the strange accounting of Einsteinian physics, they can become suffused with energy that exerts an antigravitational force. Such fields have been proposed as the source of an enormous burst of expansion, known as inflation, early in the universe and, possibly, as the secret of the dark energy that now seems to be speeding up the expansion of the universe.
