= The God Particle (book) =

Book by Leon M. Lederman

- First edition cover
- Author: Leon M. Lederman, with Dick Teresi
- Language: English
- Subject: Physics
- Publisher: Dell Publishing
- Publication date: 1993
- Publication place: United States
- Media type: Print (Hardback & Paperback)
- ISBN: 0-385-31211-3 (Original hardcover)

The God Particle: If the Universe Is the Answer, What Is the Question? is a 1993 popular science book by Nobel Prize-winning physicist Leon M. Lederman and science writer Dick Teresi.

The book provides a brief history of particle physics, starting with the pre-Socratic Greek philosopher Democritus, and continuing through Isaac Newton, Roger J. Boscovich, Michael Faraday, and Ernest Rutherford and quantum physics in the 20th century.

Lederman explains in the book why he gave the Higgs boson the nickname "The God Particle":

This boson is so central to the state of physics today, so crucial to our final understanding of the structure of matter, yet so elusive, that I have given it a nickname: the God Particle. Why God Particle? Two reasons. One, the publisher wouldn't let us call it the Goddamn Particle, though that might be a more appropriate title, given its villainous nature and the expense it is causing. And two, there is a connection, of sorts, to another book, a much older one...

— p. 22

In 2013, subsequent to the discovery of the Higgs boson, Lederman co-authored, with theoretical physicist Christopher T. Hill, a sequel: Beyond the God Particle which delves into the future of particle physics in the post-Higgs boson era. This book is part of a trilogy, with companions, Symmetry and the Beautiful Universe and Quantum Physics for Poets (see bibliography below).

== Historical context ==
Fermilab director and subsequent Nobel Prize in Physics winner Leon Lederman was a very prominent early supporter – some sources say the architect or proposer – of the Superconducting Super Collider project, which was endorsed around 1983, and was a major proponent and advocate throughout its lifetime. Lederman wrote his 1993 popular science book – which sought to promote awareness of the significance of such a project – in the context of the project's last years and the changing political climate of the 1990s. The increasingly doomed project was finally shelved that same year after some $2 billion of expenditure. The proximate causes of the closure were the rising US budget deficit, rising projected costs of the project, and the cessation of the Cold War, which reduced the perceived political pressure within the United States to undertake and complete high-profile science megaprojects.

== List of chapters ==
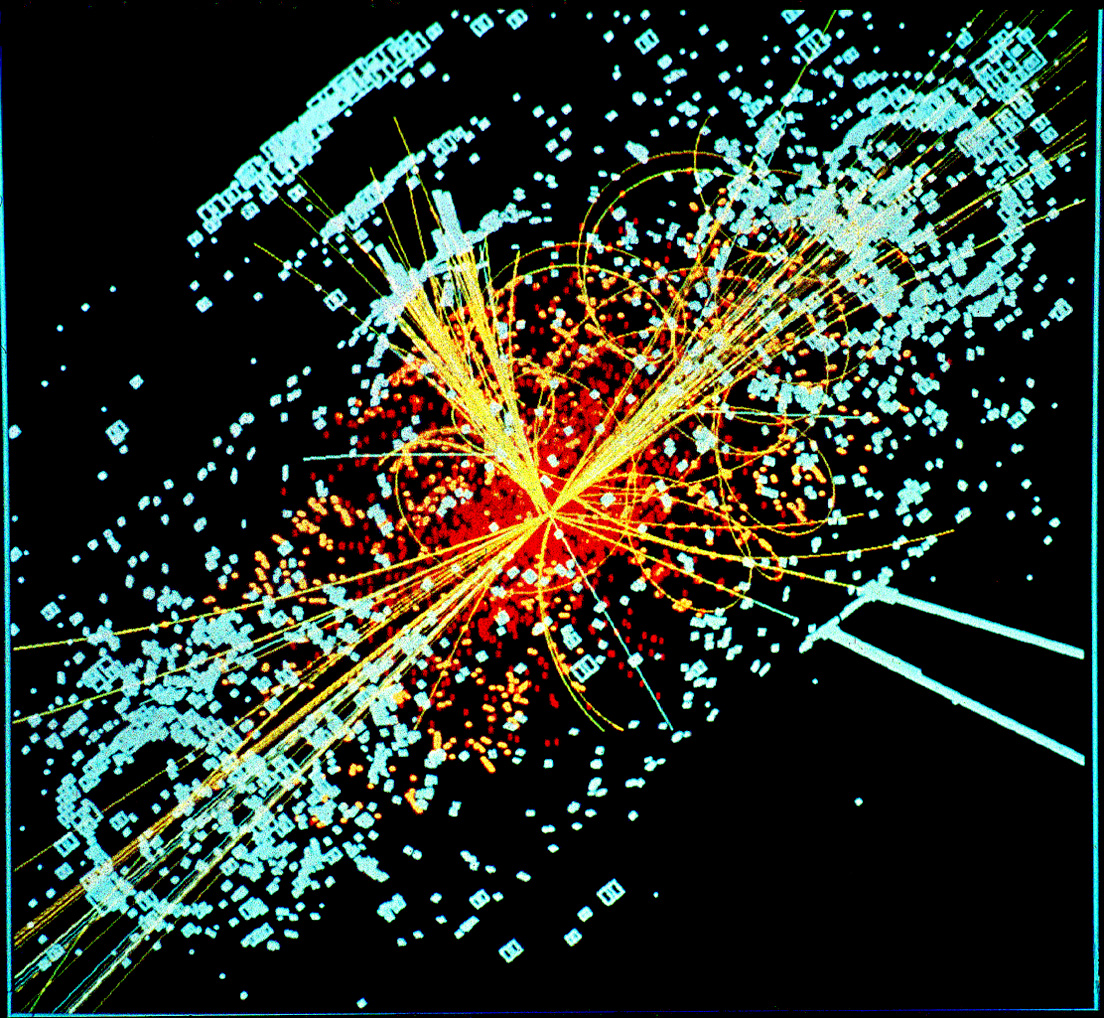
A simulated event at the Large Hadron Collider. This simulation depicts the decay of a Higgs particle following a collision of two protons in the CMS experiment

- Chapter 1: The Invisible Soccer Ball: This chapter uses a metaphor of a soccer game with an invisible ball to depict the process by which the existence of particles are deduced. Also, in this chapter Dr. Lederman gives a brief background story of what led him to particle physics.
- Chapter 2: The First Particle Physicist: In a fictional dream, Dr. Lederman meets Democritus, an ancient Greek philosopher who lived during the Classical Greek Civilization, and has a conversation (a Socratic dialogue) with him.
- Chapter 3: Looking For The Atom: The Mechanics: This chapter covers Galileo, Tycho Brahe, Johannes Kepler and Isaac Newton.
- Chapter 4: Still Looking for the Atom: Chemists and Electricians: This chapter covers physicists from the 18th century onward including J.J. Thomson, a physicist, and John Dalton, and Dmitri Mendeleev both chemists (1834–1907).
- Chapter 5: The Naked Atom: This chapter paints a picture of the shift from classical physics to the birth and development of quantum mechanics.
- Chapter 6: Accelerators: They Smash Atoms, Don’t They?: Covers the development of particle accelerators. (The chapter title is likely a wry allusion to the 1969 film They Shoot Horses, Don't They?)
- Chapter 7: A-tom!: The book uses the word "A-tom" to refer to Democritus' fundamental, uncuttable particle. This chapter covers the discovery of the fundamental particles of the Standard Model.
- Chapter 8: The God Particle At Last: Covers spontaneous symmetry breaking and the Higgs boson.
- Chapter 9: Inner Space, Outer Space, and the Time Before Time: Looks at astrophysics and describes the evidence for the Big Bang.

== See also ==
- C. R. Hagen
- François Englert
- Gerald Guralnik
- Higgs mechanism
- Large Hadron Collider
- Peter Higgs
- Robert Brout
- Tom Kibble
- Copenhagen interpretation

== Bibliography ==
- L&T = Leon M. Lederman and Dick Teresi (2006) [1993]. The God Particle: If the Universe is the Answer, What is the Question?. Boston: Houghton Mifflin Company. ISBN 978-0-61871-168-0.
- Symmetry and the Beautiful Universe, Christopher T. Hill and Leon M. Lederman, Prometheus Books (2005)
- Quantum Physics for Poets, Christopher T. Hill and Leon M. Lederman, Prometheus Books (2010)
- Beyond the God Particle, Christopher T. Hill and Leon M. Lederman, Prometheus Books (2013)
