= Robert Brout =

American-born Belgian physicist (1928–2011)

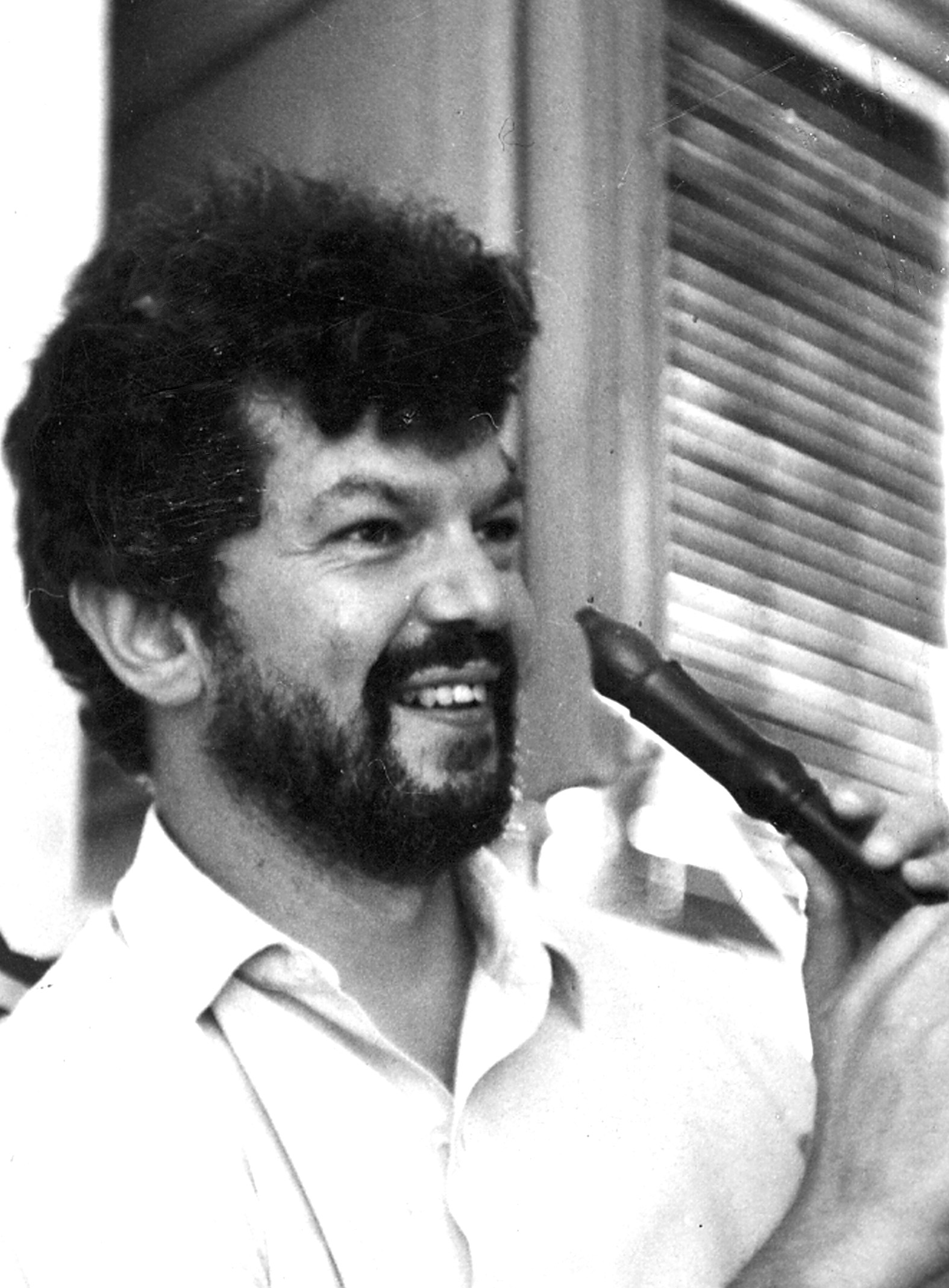
- Born: June 14, 1928; New York City, U.S.
- Died: May 3, 2011 (aged 82); Linkebeek, Belgium
- Education: New York University (BS); Columbia University (PhD)
- Known for: Symmetry breaking Higgs boson Higgs mechanism Cosmic inflation
- Awards: Sakurai Prize; Wolf Prize in Physics (2004)
- Scientific career
- Fields: Statistical mechanics Quantum field theory Particle physics Cosmology
- Workplaces: Université libre de Bruxelles; University of Rochester; Cornell University

Robert Brout (/braʊt/; June 14, 1928 – May 3, 2011) was an American-born Belgian theoretical physicist who made contributions in elementary particle physics. He was a professor of physics at the Université libre de Bruxelles where he created, together with François Englert, the Service de Physique Théorique.

== Early life and education ==
Brout was born in New York City in 1928. He graduated from Columbia University in 1953.

== Career ==
After receiving his Ph.D. from Columbia University in 1953, Brout joined the faculty at Cornell University. In 1959, François Englert, visiting from Belgium, spent two years at Cornell as a research associate with Brout. Brout and Englert became close friends and collaborators. In 1961, when Englert returned to Belgium, Brout followed him and spent the rest of his professional life at the Université libre de Bruxelles, ultimately acquiring Belgian citizenship.

== Research ==
In 1964, Brout, in collaboration with Englert, discovered how mass can be generated for gauge particles in the presence of a local abelian and non-abelian gauge symmetry. This was demonstrated by them, both classically and quantum mechanically, successfully avoiding theorems initiated by J. Goldstone while indicating that the theory would be renormalizable. Similar ideas have been developed in condensed matter physics.

Contemporaneously, Peter Higgs and Gerald Guralnik, C. R. Hagen, and Tom Kibble came to the same conclusion as Brout and Englert. The three papers written on this boson discovery by Higgs, Brout and Englert, and Guralnik, Hagen, Kibble were each recognized as milestone papers by Physical Review Letters 50th anniversary celebration. While each of these famous papers took similar approaches, the contributions and differences between the 1964 PRL symmetry breaking papers are noteworthy. This work showed that the particles that carry the weak force acquire their mass through interactions with an all-pervasive field that is now known as the Higgs field, and that the interactions occur via particles that are widely known as Higgs bosons. These Higgs bosons had not yet been observed experimentally; however, most physicists believed that they existed. On July 4, 2012, it was announced at CERN that a new particle, "consistent with a Higgs boson", had been discovered with 5 sigma confidence in the mass region around 125-126 GeV. In 2013, Englert and Higgs were to receive the Nobel Prize in Physics for their prediction.

In 1971, Gerardus 't Hooft, who was completing his PhD under the supervision of Martinus J. G. Veltman at Utrecht University, renormalized Yang–Mills theory following Veltman's suggestion that this was possible. They showed that if the symmetries of Yang–Mills theory were to be broken according to the method suggested by Robert Brout, François Englert, Peter W. Higgs, Gerald Guralnik, C. R. Hagen and Tom Kibble then Yang–Mills theory is indeed renormalizable. Renormalization of Yang–Mills theory is one of the biggest achievements of twentieth-century physics. Gerardus 't Hooft and Martinus J. G. Veltman were awarded the Nobel Prize in Physics in 1999 for this work.

In addition to this work on elementary particle physics, in 1978, Brout, in collaboration with François Englert and Edgard Gunzig, was awarded the first prize gravitational award essay for their original proposal of cosmic inflation as the condition of the cosmos before the adiabatic expansion, (i.e. the conventional Big Bang), after cosmogenesis.

== Awards ==
In 1997 the European Physical Society awarded Robert Brout with the High Energy Particle Physics Prize (jointly with Francois Englert and Peter W. Higgs) "for formulating for the first time a self-consistent theory of charged massive vector bosons which became the foundation of the electroweak theory of elementary particles". In 2004, Robert Brout, François Englert, and Peter Higgs were awarded the Wolf Prize in Physics "for pioneering work that has led to the insight of mass generation, whenever a local gauge symmetry is realized asymmetrically in the world of sub-atomic particles". Brout was awarded the 2010 J. J. Sakurai Prize for Theoretical Particle Physics (with Guralnik, Hagen, Kibble, Higgs, and Englert) by The American Physical Society "For elucidation of the properties of spontaneous symmetry breaking in four-dimensional relativistic gauge theory and of the mechanism for the consistent generation of vector boson masses."

Robert Brout made significant contributions to the theory behind the Higgs Boson, for which the 2013 Nobel Prize was awarded. In a 2014 interview with BBC's The Life Scientific Peter Higgs says of the 2013 Nobel Prize that "I think it's good that they restricted the prize to the two of us, because, by implication, they're recognizing Robert Brout as the third who couldn't be awarded the prize."

== Personal life ==
Brout died in 2011 at his home in Linkebeek, a municipality south of Brussels, Belgium.
