= Classical Mechanics (disambiguation) =

Classical mechanics is a physical theory describing the motion of objects.

Classical Mechanics may also refer to:

- Classical Mechanics (Goldstein), a 1950 textbook written by Herbert Goldstein
- Classical Mechanics (Kibble and Berkshire), a 1966 textbook written by Thomas Walter Bannerman Kibble and Frank Berkshire
