= François Englert =

Belgian theoretical physicist (1932–2026)

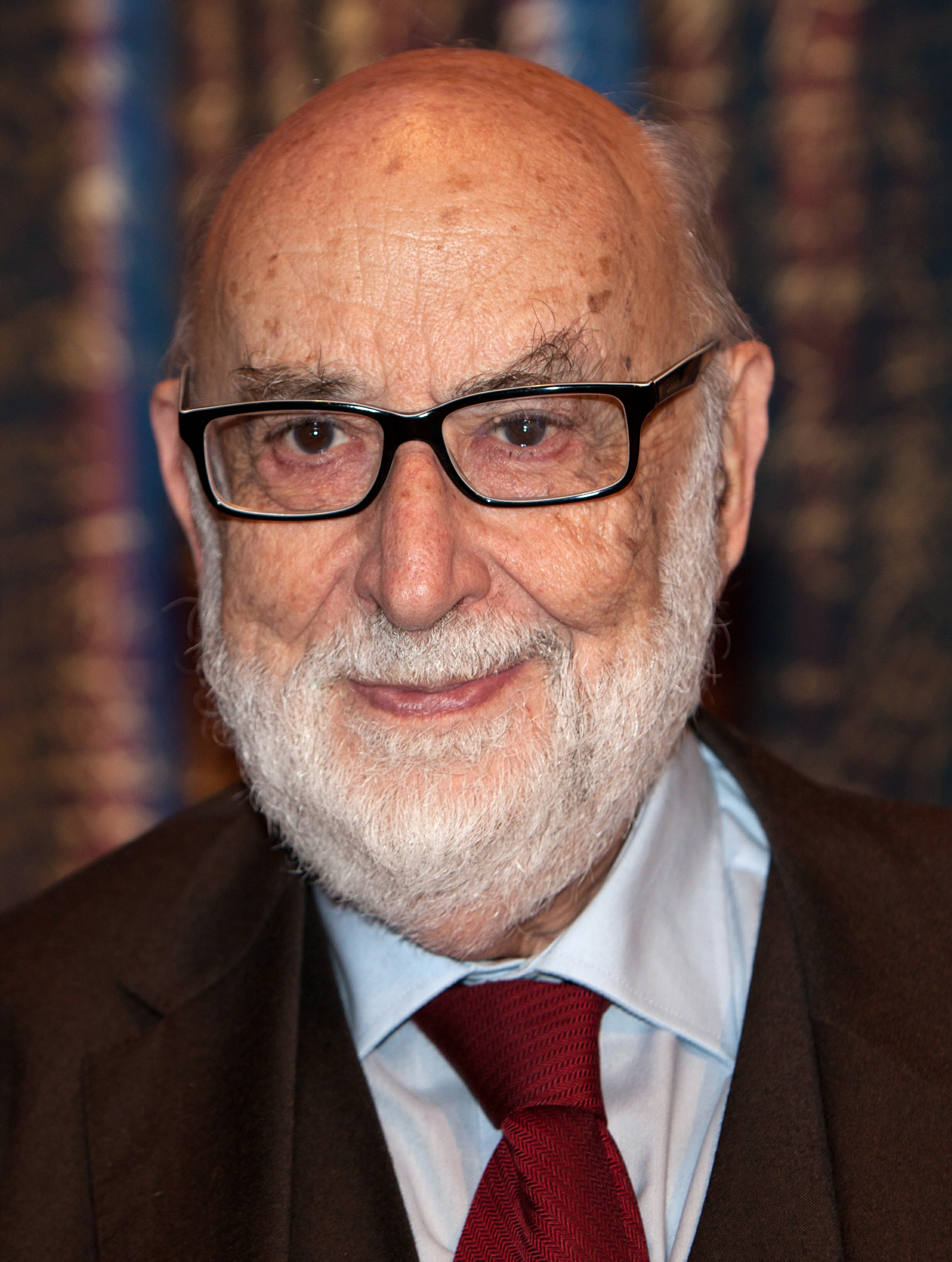
- Englert in 2013
- Born: 6 November 1932; Etterbeek, Brussels, Belgium
- Died: 18 June 2026 (aged 93); Uccle, Brussels, Belgium
- Education: Free University of Brussels
- Known for: Higgs mechanism Higgs boson Spontaneous symmetry breaking
- Awards: Francqui Prize (1982); Wolf Prize in Physics (2004); Sakurai Prize (2010); Nobel Prize in Physics (2013)
- Scientific career
- Fields: Theoretical physics
- Workplaces: Université libre de Bruxelles; Tel Aviv University

Signature
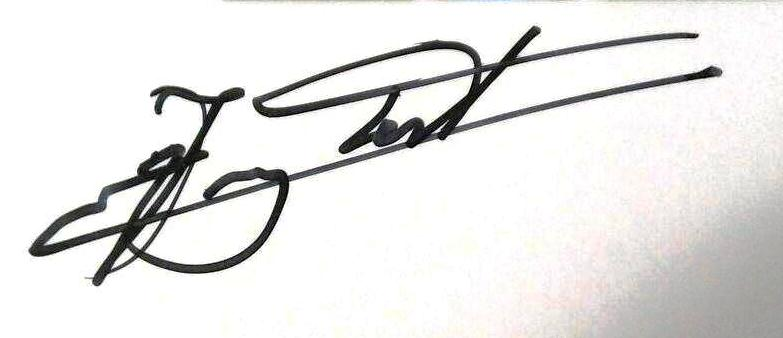

François, Baron Englert (French: [ɑ̃ɡlɛʁ]; 6 November 1932 – 18 June 2026) was a Belgian theoretical physicist and 2013 Nobel Prize laureate.

Englert was professor emeritus at the Université libre de Bruxelles (ULB), where he was a member of the Service de Physique Théorique. He was also a Sackler Professor by Special Appointment in the School of Physics and Astronomy at Tel Aviv University and a member of the Institute for Quantum Studies at Chapman University in California. He was awarded the 2010 J. J. Sakurai Prize for Theoretical Particle Physics (with Gerry Guralnik, C. R. Hagen, Tom Kibble, Peter Higgs, and Robert Brout), the Wolf Prize in Physics in 2004 (with Brout and Higgs) and the High Energy and Particle Prize of the European Physical Society (with Brout and Higgs) in 1997 for the mechanism which unifies short and long range interactions by generating massive gauge vector bosons.

Englert made contributions in statistical physics, quantum field theory, cosmology, string theory, and supergravity. He was the recipient of the 2013 Prince of Asturias Award in technical and scientific research, together with Peter Higgs and CERN.

Englert was awarded the 2013 Nobel Prize in Physics, together with Peter Higgs for the discovery of the Brout–Englert–Higgs mechanism.

== Early life ==
François Englert was a Holocaust survivor. He was born on 6 November 1932, into a Belgian Jewish family. During the German occupation of Belgium in World War II, he had to conceal his Jewish identity and live in orphanages and children's homes in the towns of Dinant, Lustin, Stoumont and, finally, Annevoie-Rouillon. The U.S. Army eventually liberated these towns.

== Academic career ==
Englert graduated as an electromechanical engineer in 1955 from the Free University of Brussels (ULB) where he received his PhD in physical sciences in 1959. From 1959 until 1961, he worked at Cornell University, first as a research associate of Robert Brout and then as assistant professor. He then returned to the ULB, where he became a university professor and was joined there by Brout who, in 1980, with Englert coheaded the theoretical physics group. In 1998 Englert became professor emeritus. In 1984 Englert was first appointed a Sackler Professor by Special Appointment in the School of Physics and Astronomy at Tel-Aviv University. Englert joined Chapman University's Institute for Quantum Studies in 2011, where he served as a distinguished visiting professor.

== Brout–Englert–Higgs–Guralnik–Hagen–Kibble mechanism ==
Brout and Englert showed in 1964 that gauge vector fields, abelian and non-abelian, could acquire mass if empty space were endowed with a particular type of structure that one encounters in material systems. Focusing on the failure of the Goldstone theorem for gauge fields, Higgs reached essentially the same result. A third paper on the subject was written later in the same year by Gerald Guralnik, C. R. Hagen, and Tom Kibble. The three papers written on this boson discovery by Higgs, Englert, and Brout, and Guralnik, Hagen, Kibble were each recognized as milestone papers for this discovery by Physical Review Letters 50th anniversary celebration. While each of these famous papers took similar approaches, the contributions and differences between the 1964 PRL symmetry breaking papers is noteworthy.

To illustrate the structure, consider a ferromagnet which is composed of atoms each equipped with a tiny magnet. When these magnets are lined up, the inside of the ferromagnet bears a strong analogy to the way empty space can be structured. Gauge vector fields that are sensitive to this structure of empty space can only propagate over a finite distance. Thus, they mediate short range interactions and acquire mass. Those fields that are not sensitive to the structure propagate unhindered. They remain massless and are responsible for the long range interactions. In this way, the mechanism accommodates within a single unified theory both short and long-range interactions.

Brout and Englert, Higgs, and Guralnik, Hagen, and Kibble introduced as agent of the vacuum structure a scalar field (most often called the Higgs field) which many physicists view as the agent responsible for the masses of fundamental particles. Brout and Englert also showed that the mechanism may remain valid if the scalar field is replaced by a more structured agent such as a fermion condensate. Their approach led them to conjecture that the theory is renormalizable. The eventual proof of renormalizability, a major achievement of twentieth century physics, is due to Gerardus 't Hooft and Martinus Veltman who were awarded the 1999 Nobel Prize for this work. The Brout–Englert–Higgs–Guralnik–Hagen–Kibble mechanism is the building stone of the electroweak theory of elementary particles and laid the foundation of a unified view of the basic laws of nature.

== Death ==
Englert died on 18 June 2026 in the Uccle municipality of Brussels at the age of 93.

== Awards ==
- 1978 First Prize in the International Gravity Contest (with R. Brout and E. Gunzig), awarded by the Gravity Research Foundation for the essay "The Causal Universe".
- 1982 Francqui Prize, awarded by the Francqui Foundation once every four years in exact sciences "For his contribution to the theoretical understanding of spontaneous symmetry breaking in the physics of fundamental interactions, where, with Robert Brout, he was the first to show that spontaneous symmetry breaking in gauge theories gives mass to the gauge particles, for his extensive contributions in other domains, such as solid state physics, statistical mechanics!, quantum field theory, general relativity and cosmology, for the originality and the fundamental importance of these achievements".
- 1997 High Energy and Particle Physics Prize (with R. Brout and P.W. Higgs), awarded by the European Physical Society "For formulating for the first time a self-consistent theory of charged massive vector bosons which became the foundation of the electroweak theory of elementary particles".
- 2004 Wolf Prize in Physics (with R. Brout and P.W. Higgs), awarded by the Wolf Foundation "For pioneering work that has led to the insight of mass generation, whenever a local gauge symmetry is realized asymmetrically in the world of sub-atomic particles".
- 2010 J. J. Sakurai Prize for Theoretical Particle Physics (with Guralnik, Hagen, Kibble, Higgs, and Brout) awarded by The American Physical Society "For elucidation of the properties of spontaneous symmetry breaking in four-dimensional relativistic gauge theory and of the mechanism for the consistent generation of vector boson masses".
- By Royal Decree of 8 July 2013 François Englert was ennobled a baron by King Albert II of Belgium.
- 2013 Nobel Prize in Physics, shared with Peter Higgs "for the theoretical discovery of a mechanism that contributes to our understanding of the origin of mass of subatomic particles, and which recently was confirmed through the discovery of the predicted fundamental particle, by the ATLAS and CMS experiments at CERN’s Large Hadron Collider".
- 2013 Prince of Asturias Award for Technical and Scientific Research (with Peter Higgs and CERN) "for the theoretical prediction and experimental detection of the Higgs boson".

== See also ==
- List of Jewish Nobel laureates
- List of West European Jews
