= Peter Higgs =

British theoretical physicist (1929–2024)

Professor Peter Higgs CH FRS FRSE HonFInstP
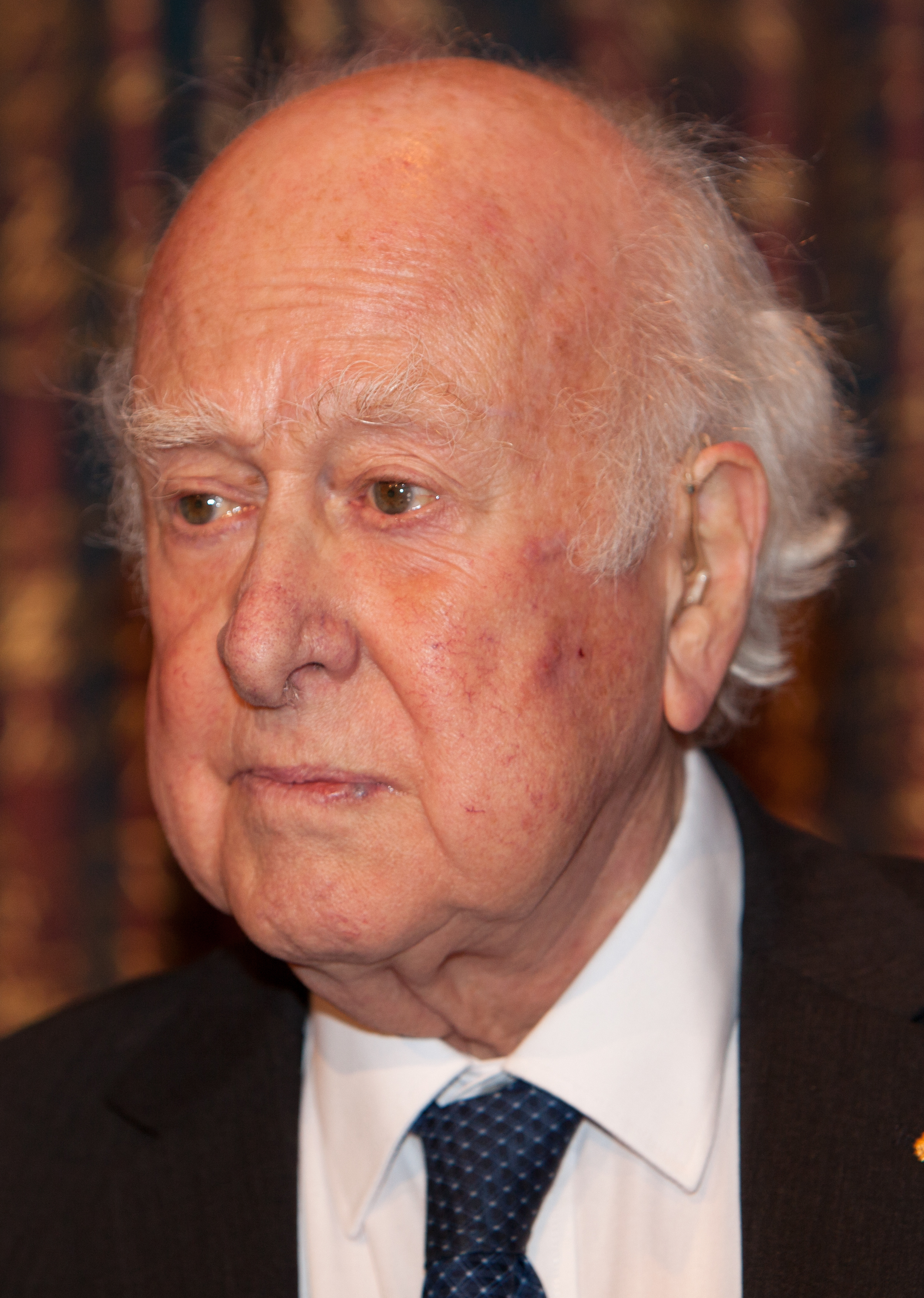
- Higgs in 2013
- Born: Peter Ware Higgs; 29 May 1929; Newcastle upon Tyne, England, United Kingdom
- Died: 8 April 2024 (aged 94); Edinburgh, Scotland, United Kingdom
- Education: King's College London (BSc, MSc, PhD)
- Known for: Higgs boson; Higgs field; Higgs mechanism; Spontaneous symmetry breaking
- Spouse: Jody Williamson (m. 1963; sep. 1972)
- Children: 2
- Awards: Hughes Medal (1981); Rutherford Medal (1984); Dirac Medal and Prize (1997); High Energy and Particle Physics Prize (1997); Royal Medal (2000); Wolf Prize in Physics (2004); Oskar Klein Memorial Lecture and Medal (2009); J.J. Sakurai Prize (2010); Nobel Prize in Physics (2013); Princess of Asturias Award (2013); Copley Medal (2015)
- Scientific career
- Fields: Theoretical physics
- Workplaces: University of Edinburgh; Imperial College London; University College London; King's College London
- Thesis: Some problems in the theory of molecular vibrations (1954)
- Doctoral advisors: Charles Coulson; Christopher Longuet-Higgins
- Doctoral students: Lewis Ryder; David Wallace; Christopher Bishop
- Website: www.ph.ed.ac.uk/higgs

Signature
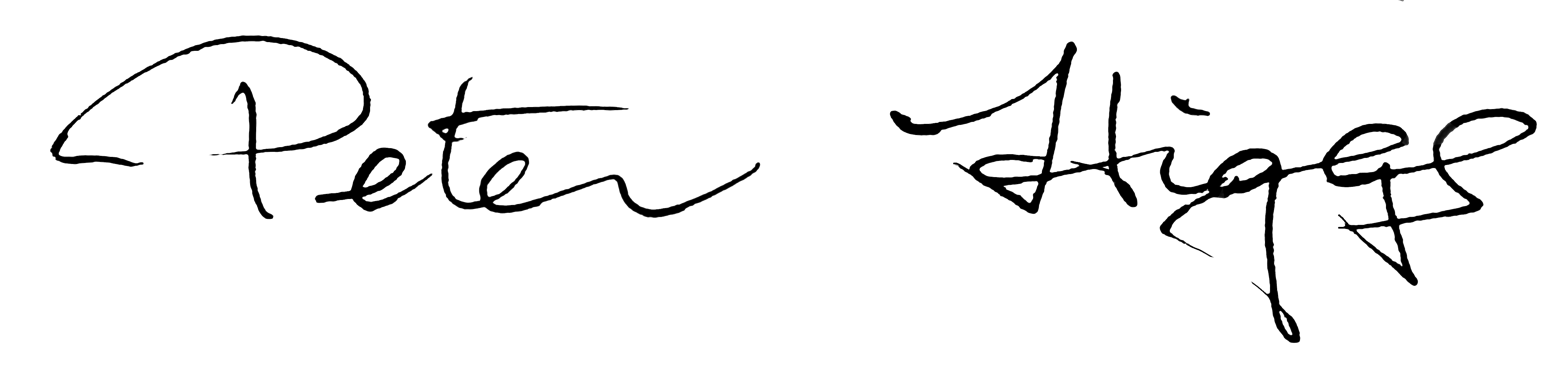

Peter Ware Higgs (29 May 1929 – 8 April 2024) was a British theoretical physicist, professor at the University of Edinburgh, and Nobel laureate in Physics for his work on the mass of subatomic particles.

In 1964, Higgs was the single author of one of the three milestone papers published in Physical Review Letters (PRL) which proposed that spontaneous symmetry breaking in electroweak theory could explain the origin of mass of elementary particles in general and of the W and Z bosons in particular. This Higgs mechanism predicted the existence of a new particle, the Higgs boson, the detection of which became one of the great goals of physics. In 2012, CERN announced the discovery of the Higgs boson at the Large Hadron Collider. The Higgs mechanism is generally accepted as an important ingredient in the Standard Model of particle physics, without which certain particles would have no mass.

For this work, Higgs received the Nobel Prize in Physics, which he shared with Belgian François Englert in 2013.

== Early life and education ==
Higgs was born in the Elswick district of Newcastle upon Tyne, England, to Thomas Ware Higgs (1898–1962) and his wife Gertrude Maude née Coghill (1895–1969). His father worked as a sound engineer for the BBC, and as a result of childhood asthma, together with the family moving around because of his father's job and later World War II, Higgs missed some early schooling and was taught at home. When his father relocated to Bedford, Higgs stayed behind in Bristol with his mother, and was largely raised there. He attended Cotham Grammar School in Bristol from 1941 to 1946, where he was inspired by the work of one of the school's alumni, Paul Dirac, a founder of the field of quantum mechanics.

In 1946, at the age of 17, Higgs moved to City of London School, where he specialised in mathematics, then in 1947 to King's College London, where he graduated with a first-class honours degree in physics in 1950 and achieved a master's degree in 1952. He was awarded an 1851 Research Fellowship from the Royal Commission for the Exhibition of 1851, and performed his doctoral research in molecular physics under the supervision of Charles Coulson and Christopher Longuet-Higgins. He was awarded a PhD degree in 1954 with a thesis entitled Some problems in the theory of molecular vibrations from the university.

== Career and research ==
After finishing his doctorate, Higgs was appointed a Senior Research Fellow at the University of Edinburgh (1954–56). He then held various posts at Imperial College London, and University College London (where he also became a temporary lecturer in mathematics). He returned to the University of Edinburgh in 1960 to take up the post of Lecturer at the Tait Institute of Mathematical Physics, allowing him to settle in the city he had enjoyed while hitchhiking to the Western Highlands as a student in 1949. He was promoted to Reader, became a Fellow of the Royal Society of Edinburgh (FRSE) in 1974 and was promoted to a personal chair of Theoretical Physics in 1980. On his retirement in 1996, he became an emeritus professor.

Higgs was elected Fellow of the Royal Society (FRS) in 1983 and Fellow of the Institute of Physics (FInstP) in 1991. He was awarded the Rutherford Medal and Prize in 1984. He received an honorary degree from the University of Bristol in 1997. In 2008, he received an Honorary Fellowship from Swansea University for his work in particle physics.

At Edinburgh, Higgs first became interested in mass, developing the idea that particles – massless when the universe began – acquired mass a fraction of a second later as a result of interacting with a theoretical field (which became known as the Higgs field). Higgs postulated that this field permeates space, giving mass to all elementary subatomic particles interacting with it.

The Higgs mechanism postulates the existence of the Higgs field, which confers mass on quarks and leptons; this causes only a tiny portion of the masses of other subatomic particles, such as protons and neutrons. In these, gluons that bind quarks together confer most of the particle mass. The original basis of Higgs's work came from the Japanese-born theorist and Nobel Prize laureate Yoichiro Nambu from the University of Chicago. Nambu had proposed a theory known as spontaneous symmetry breaking based on what was known to happen in superconductivity in condensed matter, which incorrectly predicted massless particles (the Goldstone's theorem).

Higgs reportedly developed the fundamentals of his theory after returning to his Edinburgh New Town apartment from a failed weekend camping trip to the Highlands. He stated that there was no "eureka moment" in the development of the theory. He wrote a short paper exploiting a loophole in Goldstone's theorem (massless Goldstone particles need not occur when local symmetry is spontaneously broken in a relativistic theory) and published it in Physics Letters, a European physics journal edited at CERN, in Switzerland, in 1964.

Higgs wrote a second paper describing a theoretical model (the Higgs mechanism), but the paper was rejected (the editors of Physics Letters judged it "of no obvious relevance to physics"). Higgs wrote an extra paragraph and sent his paper to Physical Review Letters, another leading physics journal, which published it later in 1964. This paper predicted a new massive spin-zero boson (later named the Higgs boson). Other physicists, Robert Brout and François Englert and Gerald Guralnik, C. R. Hagen and Tom Kibble had reached similar conclusions at about the same time. In the published version, Higgs quotes Brout and Englert, and the third paper quotes the previous ones. The three papers written on this boson discovery by Higgs, Guralnik, Hagen, Kibble, Brout, and Englert were each recognised as milestone papers by Physical Review Letters 50th-anniversary celebration. While each of these famous papers took similar approaches, the contributions and differences between the 1964 PRL symmetry breaking papers are noteworthy. The mechanism had been proposed in 1962 by Philip Anderson although he did not include a crucial relativistic model.

On 4 July 2012, CERN announced the ATLAS and Compact Muon Solenoid (CMS) experiments had seen strong indications for the presence of a new particle, which could be the Higgs boson, in the mass region around 126 gigaelectronvolts (GeV). Speaking at the seminar in Geneva, Higgs commented "It's really an incredible thing that it's happened in my lifetime." Ironically, this probable confirmation of the Higgs boson was made at the same place where the editor of Physics Letters rejected Higgs's paper.

== Awards and honours ==
Higgs was honoured with several awards in recognition of his work, including the 1981 Hughes Medal from the Royal Society; the 1984 Rutherford Medal from the Institute of Physics; the 1997 Dirac Medal and Prize for outstanding contributions to theoretical physics from the Institute of Physics; the 1997 High Energy and Particle Physics Prize by the European Physical Society; the 2004 Wolf Prize in Physics; the 2009 Oskar Klein Memorial Lecture medal from the Royal Swedish Academy of Sciences; the 2010 American Physical Society J. J. Sakurai Prize for Theoretical Particle Physics; a unique Higgs Medal from the Royal Society of Edinburgh in 2012; and the Royal Society awarded him the 2015 Copley Medal, the world's oldest scientific prize.

=== Civic awards ===
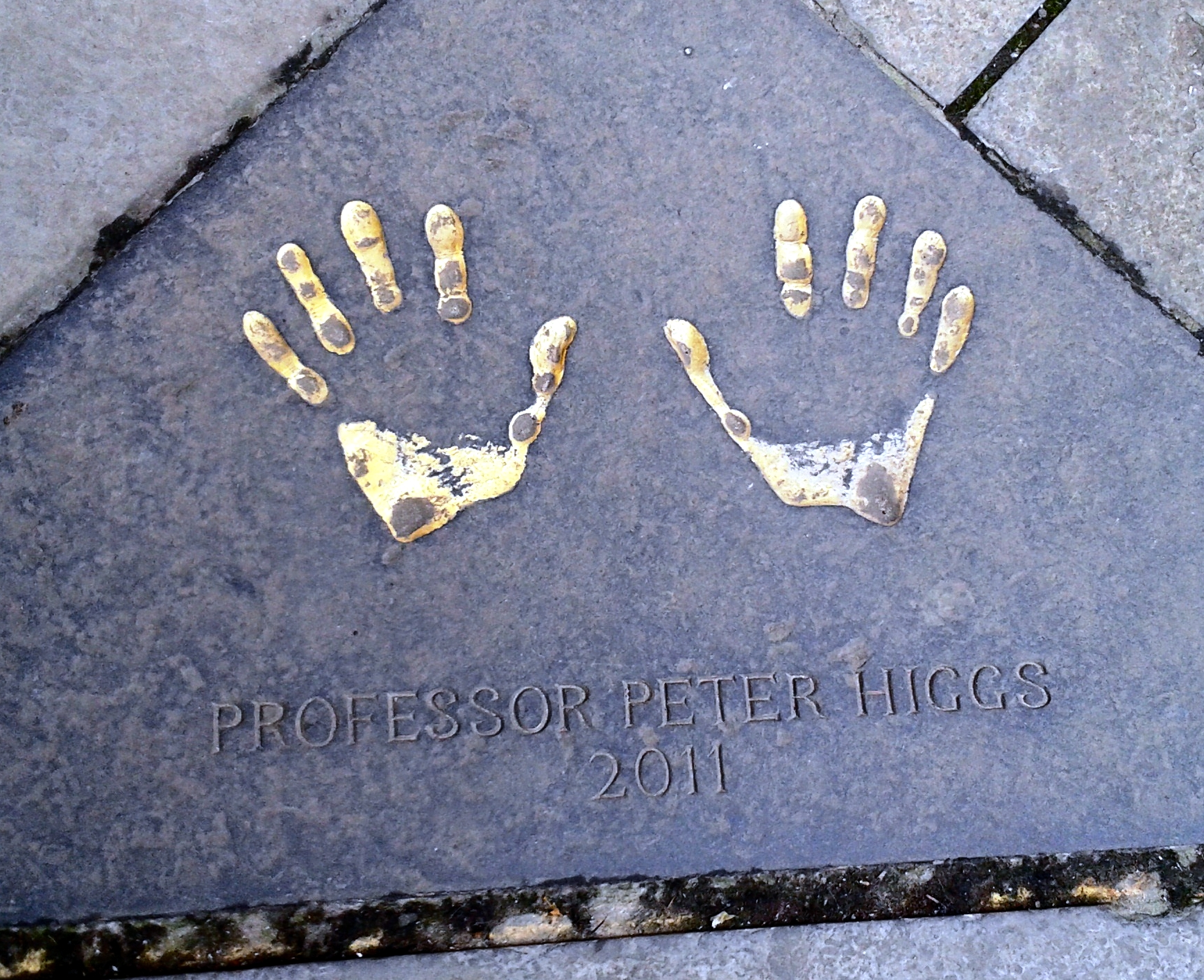
Edinburgh Award handprints

Higgs was the recipient of the Edinburgh Award for 2011. He was the fifth person to receive the Award, which was established in 2007 by the City of Edinburgh Council to honour an outstanding individual who has made a positive impact on the city and gained national and international recognition for Edinburgh.

Higgs was presented with an engraved loving cup by the Rt Hon George Grubb, Lord Provost of Edinburgh, in a ceremony held at the City Chambers on Friday, 24 February 2012. The event also marked the unveiling of his handprints in the City Chambers quadrangle, where they had been engraved in Caithness stone alongside those of previous Edinburgh Award recipients.

Higgs was awarded the Freedom of the City of Bristol in July 2013. The Dirac-Higgs Science Centre in Bristol is also named in his honour. In April 2014, he was also awarded the Freedom of the City of Newcastle upon Tyne. He was also honoured with a brass plaque installed on the Newcastle Quayside as part of the Newcastle Gateshead Initiative Local Heroes Walk of Fame.

=== Higgs Centre for Theoretical Physics ===
On 6 July 2012, Edinburgh University announced a new centre named after Professor Higgs to support future research in theoretical physics. The Higgs Centre for Theoretical Physics brings together scientists from around the world to seek "a deeper understanding of how the universe works". The centre is currently based within the James Clerk Maxwell Building, home of the university's School of Physics and Astronomy and the iGEM 2015 team (ClassAfiED). The university has also established a chair of theoretical physics in the name of Peter Higgs, currently held by cosmologist Neil Turok.

=== Nobel Prize in Physics ===
On 8 October 2013, it was announced that Higgs and François Englert would share the 2013 Nobel Prize in Physics "for the theoretical discovery of a mechanism that contributes to our understanding of the origin of mass of subatomic particles, and which recently was confirmed through the discovery of the predicted fundamental particle, by the ATLAS and CMS experiments at CERN's Large Hadron Collider". Higgs admitted he had gone out to avoid the media attention so he was informed he had been awarded the prize by an ex-neighbour on his way home, since he did not have a mobile phone.

In November 2025, it was reported that Higgs had left his Nobel Prize medal to Edinburgh University in his will.

=== Member of the Order of the Companions of Honour ===
Higgs turned down a knighthood in 1999, but in 2012, he accepted membership of the Order of the Companions of Honour. He later said that he only accepted the order because he was wrongly assured that the award was in the gift of the Queen alone. He also expressed cynicism towards the honours system, and the way the system "is used for political purposes by the government in power". The order confers no title or precedence, but recipients of the order are entitled to use the post-nominal letters CH. In the same interview he also stated that when people ask what the CH after his name stands for, he replies "it means I'm an honorary Swiss." He received the order from the Queen at an investiture at Holyrood House on 1 July 2014.

=== Honorary degrees ===
Higgs was awarded honorary degrees from the following institutions:

- DSc University of Bristol 1997
- DSc University of Edinburgh 1998
- DSc University of Glasgow 2002
- DSc Swansea University 2008
- DSc King's College London 2009
- DSc University College London 2010
- ScD University of Cambridge 2012
- DSc Heriot-Watt University 2012
- PhD SISSA, Trieste 2013
- DSc University of Durham 2013
- DSc University of Manchester 2013
- DSc University of St Andrews 2014
- DSc Free University of Brussels (ULB) 2014
- DSc University of North Carolina at Chapel Hill 2015
- DSc Queen's University Belfast 2015
- ScD Trinity College Dublin 2016

A portrait of Higgs was painted by Ken Currie in 2008. Commissioned by the University of Edinburgh, it was unveiled on 3 April 2009 and hangs in the entrance of the James Clerk Maxwell Building of the School of Physics and Astronomy and the School of Mathematics. A large portrait by Lucinda Mackay is in the collection of the Scottish National Portrait Gallery in Edinburgh. Another portrait of Higgs by the same artist hangs in the birthplace of James Clerk Maxwell in Edinburgh; Higgs was the Honorary Patron of the James Clerk Maxwell Foundation. A portrait by Victoria Crowe was commissioned by the Royal Society of Edinburgh and unveiled in 2013.

== Personal life and political views ==
Higgs married Jody Williamson, an American lecturer in linguistics at Edinburgh and a fellow activist with the Campaign for Nuclear Disarmament (CND), in 1963. Their first son was born in August 1965. Higgs had two sons: Christopher and Jonny, a jazz musician. He also had two grandchildren: Jo, a writer, and Bonnie (Kemplay), a musician. Higgs and Williamson separated in 1972 but remained friends until she died in 2008.

Higgs was an activist in the CND while in London and later in Edinburgh but resigned his membership when the group extended its remit from campaigning against nuclear weapons to campaigning against nuclear power, too. He was a Greenpeace member until the group opposed genetically modified organisms. Higgs was awarded the 2004 Wolf Prize in Physics (sharing it with Robert Brout and François Englert) but declined to attend the awards ceremony in Jerusalem in protest at Israel's treatment of Palestinians. Higgs was actively involved in the Edinburgh University branch of the Association of University Teachers, through which he agitated for greater staff involvement in the management of the physics department.

Higgs was an atheist. He described Richard Dawkins as having adopted a "fundamentalist" view of non-atheists. Higgs expressed displeasure with the nickname the "God particle". Although it has been reported that he believed the term "might offend people who are religious", Higgs stated that this is not the case, lamenting the letters he has received which claim the God particle was predicted in the Torah, the Qur'an and Buddhist scriptures. In a 2013 interview with Decca Aitkenhead, Higgs was quoted as saying:

I'm not a believer. Some people get confused between the science and the theology. They claim that what happened at CERN proves the existence of God. The church in Spain has also been guilty of using that name as evidence for what they want to prove. [It] reinforces confused thinking in the heads of people who are already thinking in a confused way. If they believe that story about creation in seven days, are they being intelligent?

— The Guardian, 6 December 2013

The nickname for the Higgs boson is usually attributed to Leon M. Lederman, the author of the book The God Particle: If the Universe Is the Answer, What Is the Question? but the name is the result of the suggestion of Lederman's publisher; Lederman had initially intended to refer to it as the "goddamn particle".

== Death ==
Higgs died after a short illness at home in Edinburgh on 8 April 2024, aged 94.

== Bibliography ==
- Higgs, Peter W. (1979). "Dynamical symmetries in a spherical geometry. I". Journal of Physics A: Mathematical and General. 12 (3): 309–323. Bibcode:1979JPhA...12..309H. doi:10.1088/0305-4470/12/3/006. ISSN 0305-4470.
- Higgs, Peter W. (27 May 1966). "Spontaneous Symmetry Breakdown without Massless Bosons". Physical Review. 145 (4): 1156–1163. Bibcode:1966PhRv..145.1156H. doi:10.1103/PhysRev.145.1156. ISSN 0031-899X.
- Higgs, Peter W. (19 October 1964). "Broken Symmetries and the Masses of Gauge Bosons". Physical Review Letters. 13 (16): 508–509. Bibcode:1964PhRvL..13..508H. doi:10.1103/PhysRevLett.13.508. ISSN 0031-9007.
- Higgs, Peter W. (1959). "Quadratic lagrangians and general relativity". Il Nuovo Cimento. 11 (6): 816–820. Bibcode:1959NCim...11..816H. doi:10.1007/BF02732547. ISSN 0029-6341.
- Higgs, Peter W. (15 November 1958). "Integration of Secondary Constraints in Quantized General Relativity". Physical Review Letters. 1 (10): 373–374. Bibcode:1958PhRvL...1..373H. doi:10.1103/PhysRevLett.1.373. ISSN 0031-9007.
- Higgs, Peter W. (1 March 1953). "Vibrational modifications of the electron distribution in molecular crystals. I. The density in a vibrating carbon atom". Acta Crystallographica. 6 (3): 232–241. Bibcode:1953AcCry...6..232H. doi:10.1107/S0365110X53000727. ISSN 0365-110X.

Awards
Preceded by Serge Haroche; David J. Wineland	Nobel Prize in Physics laureate 2013; With: François Englert	Succeeded by Isamu Akasaki; Hiroshi Amano; Shuji Nakamura
