= Frank H. Berkshire =

British mathematician

Frank H. Berkshire is a British mathematician, an expert on fluid dynamics, biomechanics, and the mathematics of gambling. He is a coauthor of the textbook Classical Mechanics.

== Education and career ==
Berkshire is an alumnus of St John's College, Cambridge. He joined the faculty in the department of mathematics at Imperial College London in 1967. There he became a senior lecturer, director of undergraduate studies since 1987, and teaching fellow in 1996.

In 2000, he won Imperial College's Rector's Medal for Outstanding Contribution to Teaching Excellence. He retired in 2011 and remains principal teaching fellow in dynamics at Imperial.

== Textbook ==
In 1997, Berkshire became a co-author on the 4th edition of Tom Kibble's textbook Classical Mechanics. The fifth edition was published by the Imperial College Press in 2004.
