= Seifallah Randjbar-Daemi =

Iranian theoretical physicist

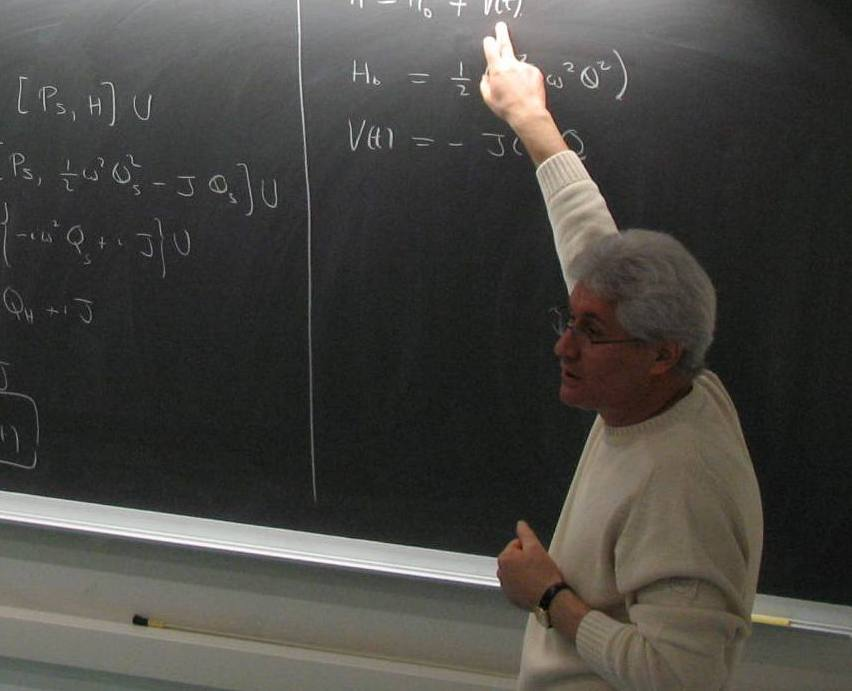
- S. Randjbar-Daemi while giving lecture on Quantum Electrodynamics to 2007-2008 High Energy diploma students at ICTP.
- Born: 1950 (age 75–76); Tabriz, Iran
- Education: Imperial College London
- Scientific career
- Fields: Physicist
- Workplaces: ICTP
- Doctoral advisor: Tom W. B. Kibble

Seifallah Randjbar-Daemi (Persian: سیف الله رنجبر دائمی; born 1950) is an Iranian theoretical physicist. He is currently an emeritus scientist at the International Centre for Theoretical Physics.

== Education and Academic career ==
Seifallah Randjbar-Daemi received his PhD in 1980 from Imperial College London, University of London, UK. Randjbar-Daemi's contributions are in the area of theoretical high energy physics, quantum field theory, superstring theory, supersymmetry and supergravity theories in all dimensions and cosmology.

He collaborated with Abdus Salam very closely at both scientific and humanitarian level since his student days at Imperial College. He joined the International Centre for Theoretical Physics(ICTP) in 1988 as Research Physicist and Coordinator of the High energy Section. Previously he had been at the Department of Theoretical Physics, University of Zurich. In 1994, he was designated as head of the High Energy Group at ICTP. In August 2005, he was promoted to assistant director of ICTP. Since April 2011, he served as the acting deputy director until his retirement on 31 December 2015.

He initiated several programmes in ICTP, for instance, the Diploma Programme and the special basic physics programme for Sub-Saharan African students. He has contributed to ICTP in many ways which are at times beyond his professional responsibilities. When ICTP was on the verge of a shutdown due to major financial crisis in 1991, his interaction with the scientific community of Iran prompted the minister of science and higher education to provide ICTP with a loan, which ensured the continuation of ICTP's operation.

Because of his outstanding contributions in promoting science and technology in the developing countries, he received the Spirit of Abdus Salam Award in the year of 2016.

== See also ==
- List of theoretical physicists
