= Dick Teresi =

American writer

Dick Teresi is an American writer. He is a co-author of The God Particle: If the Universe Is the Answer, What Is the Question? He is also a former editor of Omni.

== Career ==
With his wife Judith Hooper, Teresi has coauthored The Three Pound Universe and Would the Buddha Wear a Walkman? A Catalogue of Revolutionary Tools for Higher Consciousness. Teresi also coauthored Laser: Light of a Million Uses with Jeff Hecht.

In July 1997 he wrote an article for The Atlantic entitled "Zero", about the missing year zero between 1 AD and 1 BC, how it came to be, and the effect it has on western culture. In 1994, he wrote with his wife an article for The New York Times book section entitled "High-Concept Classics: A Quiz", about the ironic situation of the modern author having to sum up an entire book (for example, 3 years work, 175 interviews, 160,000 words) in 12 to 14 words, or a sentence and half, to help sell the book.

=== Television ===
Teresi wrote the story for the Law & Order ninth season episode "Scrambled". He shared the credit with his wife, Judith Hooper.

== Bibliography ==
- Popular Mechanics book of bikes and bicycling. New York: Hearst. 1975.
- The God Particle: If the Universe Is the Answer, What Is the Question? by Leon M. Lederman, with Dick Teresi. Dell Publishing (1993), ISBN 0-385-31211-3.
- "Zero". The Atlantic Monthly. 280 (1): 88–94. July 1997.
- Lost Discoveries: The Ancient Roots of Modern Science—from the Babylonians to the Maya. Simon & Schuster (2002), ISBN 0-684-83718-8.
- The Undead: Organ Harvesting, the Ice-Water Test, Beating Heart Cadavers – How Medicine Is Blurring the Line Between Life and Death. Pantheon (March 13, 2012), ISBN 0375423710.
