= Kenneth Alan Johnson =

American physicist

- Born: March 26, 1931; Duluth, Minnesota
- Died: February 9, 1999 (aged 67); Boston, Massachusetts
- Education: Harvard University (PhD)
- Known for: Leader in the study of quantum field theories and the quark substructure of matter
- Spouse: Gladys (Diaz de los Arcos) Johnson (m. 1950)
- Children: 1
- Scientific career
- Fields: Physics
- Workplaces: Harvard University; Niels Bohr Institute; Massachusetts Institute of Technology
- Doctoral advisor: Julian Schwinger
- Doctoral students: C. R. Hagen

Kenneth Alan Johnson (March 26, 1931 – February 9, 1999) was an American theoretical physicist. He was professor of physics at MIT, a leader in the study of quantum field theories and the quark substructure of matter. Johnson contributed to the understanding of symmetry and anomalies in quantum field theories and to models of quark confinement and dynamics in quantum chromodynamics.

== Biography ==
=== Early life ===
Ken Johnson was a student at Case Western Reserve University and obtained his bachelor's degree from the Illinois Institute of Technology in 1952. He studied theoretical physics at Harvard University, completing his Ph.D. under the direction of Julian Schwinger in 1955. Johnson remained at Harvard as a research fellow and lecturer from 1955 through 1957 and during 1957-1958 he was an NSF Postdoctoral Fellow at the Institute for Theoretical Physics (Niels Bohr Institute), Copenhagen.

=== Career at MIT ===
Johnson was appointed to the MIT faculty in 1958 as assistant professor, promoted to associate professor in 1961, and to full professor in 1965. Johnson remained at MIT, with the exception of visiting positions at SLAC (1971–72, 1980–81), University of Washington (1972), and Nordita (1981), for the remainder of his career.

Early in his career, Johnson together with Marshall Baker (University of Washington) undertook a systematic study of the short distance and high energy behavior of quantum electrodynamics (QED), which presaged modern studies of renormalization group flow and the search for ultraviolet fixed points of the QED 𝛽-function.

Johnson was one of the first to discover chiral and other anomalies in gauge-field theories, anticipating the work of Stephen Adler (IAS), John Bell (CERN), and Roman Jackiw (MIT) on chiral anomalies. Continuing his study of anomalies, Johnson, collaborating with Francis Low (MIT), introduced limiting methods for studying the short distance behavior of operator products. Similar methods were introduced by James Bjorken (SLAC). The Bjorken–Johnson–Low Limit was used extensively in the study of scaling and perturbative anomalies in the late 1960s and was subsumed into the more general framework of the operator product expansion by Kenneth Wilson. Working with Jackiw, Johnson showed that gauge invariance could break down dynamically in a theory with massless fermions but without fundamental scalar particles, leading to mass generation for both the fermions and the gauge bosons. This work formed the foundation for technicolor theories of compositeness beyond the Standard Model. Students at MIT include C. R. Hagen, co-discoverer of the Higgs mechanism and Higgs boson.

In the early 1970s Johnson became interested in the confinement of quarks in theories of hadron structure. He led a collaboration with Alan Chodos, Robert Jaffe, Charles Thorn, and Victor Weisskopf (all MIT) in the development of a relativistic, gauge invariant, and heuristic model of quark confinement known as the “MIT Bag Model”, which emerged as a standard model for describing hadrons in quantum chromodynamics (QCD). The MIT Bag Model provided a framework for the initial investigation of many aspects of the behavior of confined quarks and gluons in QCD. In several of these studies, Johnson played a leading role. Together with Thomas DeGrand (University of Colorado), Joseph Kiskis (UC Davis), and Jaffe, Johnson showed that the spectra of light-quark baryons and mesons could be accommodated in QCD. With Thorn, Johnson demonstrated the emergence of string-like excitations of hadrons in QCD, and Johnson and Jaffe explored the spectra and interactions of exotic hadrons composed purely of gluons or made of more than three quarks. Studies of such unusual hadrons remains a topic of current experimental and theoretical interest. In his later years, Johnson focused on finding a heuristic description of the gluon field configurations that dominate the confining condensate in the QCD vacuum, a search that continues to this day.

== Personal life ==
Ken Johnson was married to Gladys (Diaz de los Arcos) Johnson, who also studied physics at Harvard in the early 1950s. Gladys was an accomplished artist. They had one son, Keith Johnson.
