= Herbert Goldstein =

American physicist

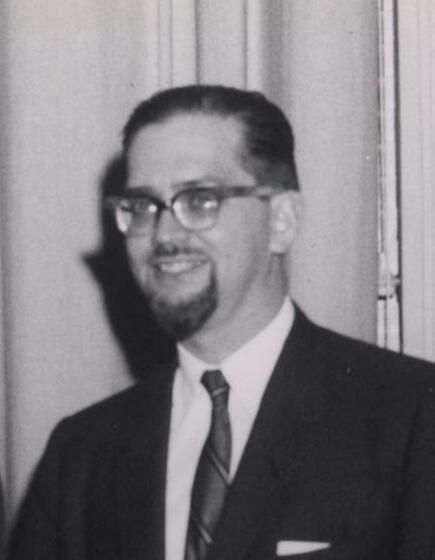
- Goldstein in 1962
- Born: June 26, 1922; Bronx, New York, United States
- Died: January 12, 2005 (aged 82)
- Education: City College of New York (B.S., 1940); Massachusetts Institute of Technology (Ph.D., 1943)
- Known for: Classical Mechanics (1950, 1980, 2001)
- Awards: E. O. Lawrence Award (1962)
- Scientific career
- Fields: Classical mechanics Nuclear physics
- Workplaces: Columbia University

Herbert Goldstein (June 26, 1922 – January 12, 2005) was an American physicist and the author of the standard graduate textbook Classical Mechanics.

== Life and work ==
Goldstein was well known as the author of the graduate textbook, Classical Mechanics. The book has been a standard text since it first appeared in 1950 and has been translated into nine languages. He was widely recognized for his scholarship in classical mechanics and reactor shielding. He received a B.S. from City College of New York in 1940 and a Ph.D. from Massachusetts Institute of Technology in 1943. From 1942 to 1946, Goldstein was a staff member of the wartime Radiation Laboratory at M.I.T., where he engaged in research on the theory of waveguides and magnetrons and on the characteristics of radar echoes. He was an instructor in the physics department at Harvard University from 1946 to 1949. In 1949–50 he was an AEC postdoctoral Fellow at M.I.T., and served as a Visiting Associate Professor of Physics at Brandeis University, 1952–53. From 1950, Goldstein was a senior physicist at Nuclear Development Corporation of America, where he directed theoretical research on the shielding of nuclear reactors and on neutron cross sections of interest for reactor design. Goldstein won the Ernest Orlando Lawrence Award in 1962 for his "contributions to reactor physics and to nuclear cross sections, and for his leadership in establishing a rational scientific basis for nuclear shield design".

Goldstein was a professor of nuclear science and engineering at Columbia University's Fu Foundation School of Engineering and Applied Science from 1961 until his death. He received the Great Teacher Award, given by the Society of Columbia Graduates, in 1976. In 1977, he was the recipient of the Distinguished Service Award from the shielding division of the American Nuclear Society. In 1984, Goldstein was the first to hold the Thomas Alva Edison Professorship at the university. He was professor emeritus at the time of his death.

He was a founding member and served as president of the Association of Orthodox Jewish Scientists. He was buried in Israel. He was survived by his wife, Channa; his children, Penina, Aaron Meir and Shoshanna; and 10 grandchildren.

== Books ==
- H. Goldstein, Classical Mechanics, Addison-Wesley, 1950. ISBN 0201025108
- H. Goldstein, Fundamental Aspects of Reactor Shielding, Addison-Wesley, 1959.
- H. Goldstein, Classical Mechanics (2nd Edition), Addison-Wesley, 1980. ISBN 0201029189
- H. Goldstein, J. L. Gross, R. E. Pollack, and R. B. Blumberg, The Scientific Experience, Columbia University, 1996.
- H. Goldstein, C. P. Poole, J. L. Safko, Classical Mechanics (3rd Edition), Addison-Wesley, 2001. ISBN 0201657023

== See also ==
- List of textbooks in classical and quantum mechanics
