= Lewis Ryder =

British theoretical physicist

Lewis Howarth Ryder (15 November 1941 – 18 December 2018) was a British theoretical physicist.

== Biography ==
Ryder earned a master's degree in physics from Oxford University, a PhD in Mathematical Physics from Edinburgh University under supervision of Peter Higgs, and later an SERC fellowship.

In 1967 he went to the University of Kent where he remained for the rest of his career and became a senior lecturer.

His research interests were in geometrical aspects of particle physics and its parallels with general relativity, and the possible existence and detection of torsion and curvature in spacetime. He also did research on the geometric phase and in condensed matter physics.

== Books ==
- 1st edition 1985; Quantum Field Theory (2nd ed.). Cambridge University Press. 1996. ISBN 978-0-521-47814-4.
- Introduction to General Relativity. Cambridge University Press. 2009. ISBN 978-0521-84563-2.
- Elementary Particles and Symmetries. Gordon & Breach Science Publishers Ltd. 1975.
