= Classical Mechanics (Kibble and Berkshire) =

Textbook by Thomas Walter Bannerman Kibble and Frank Berkshire

- First edition
- Author: Tom W. B. Kibble & Frank H. Berkshire
- Language: English
- Subject: Physics
- Genre: Non-fiction; science text
- Publisher: Imperial College Press
- Publication date: 2004
- Publication place: UK
- Pages: 500
- ISBN: 978-1-86094-435-2 (pbk)

Classical Mechanics is a textbook written by Thomas Walter Bannerman Kibble and Frank Berkshire of the Imperial College Mathematics Department. The book covers the fundamental principles and techniques of classical mechanics, a long-standing subject which is at the base of all of physics.

== Publication history ==
The first edition was published in 1966, and until the fourth edition (published in 1996), Thomas Kibble was the sole author.

The book has been translated into several languages, including French, Greek, German, Turkish, Spanish and Portuguese.

== Reception ==
The original edition was reviewed in Current Science. The fourth edition was reviewed by C. Isenberg in 1997 in the European Journal of Physics, and the fifth edition was reviewed in Contemporary Physics.

== See also ==
- Newtonian mechanics
- Classical Mechanics (Goldstein book)
- List of textbooks on classical and quantum mechanics
