= 1964 PRL symmetry breaking papers =

Scientific research articles

The 1964 PRL symmetry breaking papers were written by three teams who proposed related but different approaches to explain how mass could arise in local gauge theories. These three papers were written by: Robert Brout and François Englert; Peter Higgs; and Gerald Guralnik, C. Richard Hagen, and Tom Kibble (GHK). They are credited with the theory of the Higgs mechanism and the prediction of the Higgs field and Higgs boson. Together, these provide a theoretical means by which Goldstone's theorem (a problematic limitation affecting early modern particle physics theories) can be avoided. They showed how gauge bosons can acquire non-zero masses as a result of spontaneous symmetry breaking within gauge invariant models of the universe.

As such, these form the key element of the electroweak theory that forms part of the Standard Model of particle physics, and of many models, such as the Grand Unified Theory, that go beyond it. The papers that introduce this mechanism were published in Physical Review Letters (PRL) and were each recognized as milestone papers by PRL's 50th anniversary celebration. All of the six physicists were awarded the 2010 J. J. Sakurai Prize for Theoretical Particle Physics for this work; Brout, Englert and Higgs received the 2004 Wolf Prize in Physics; and in 2013 Englert and Higgs received the Nobel Prize in Physics.

On 4 July 2012, the two main experiments at the Large Hadron Collider (ATLAS and CMS) at CERN confirmed independently the existence of a previously unknown particle with a mass of about 125 GeV/c^{2} (about 133 proton masses, on the order of 10^{−25} kg), which is "consistent with the Higgs boson" and widely believed to be the Higgs boson.

== Introduction ==
In the mid-20th century, physicists were developing a mathematical framework to describe the fundamental particles and forces of nature, a concept known as gauge theory. This approach was very promising because it offered a way to build a consistent and comprehensive model of physics. A significant challenge, however, arose when trying to explain why some particles have mass. Early versions of these theories predicted that certain force-carrying particles should be massless, which contradicted experimental evidence.

A major hurdle was a theoretical roadblock known as Goldstone's theorem. This theorem suggested that whenever a fundamental symmetry in a theory is "spontaneously broken"—a process necessary to give particles mass—new, unwanted massless particles must appear. The 1964 papers provided a crucial insight, showing how, in the specific case of gauge theories, Goldstone's theorem could be sidestepped. This allowed for the creation of theories where force-carrying particles could have mass without introducing these problematic massless particles. The solution they described is now known as the Higgs mechanism.

== History ==
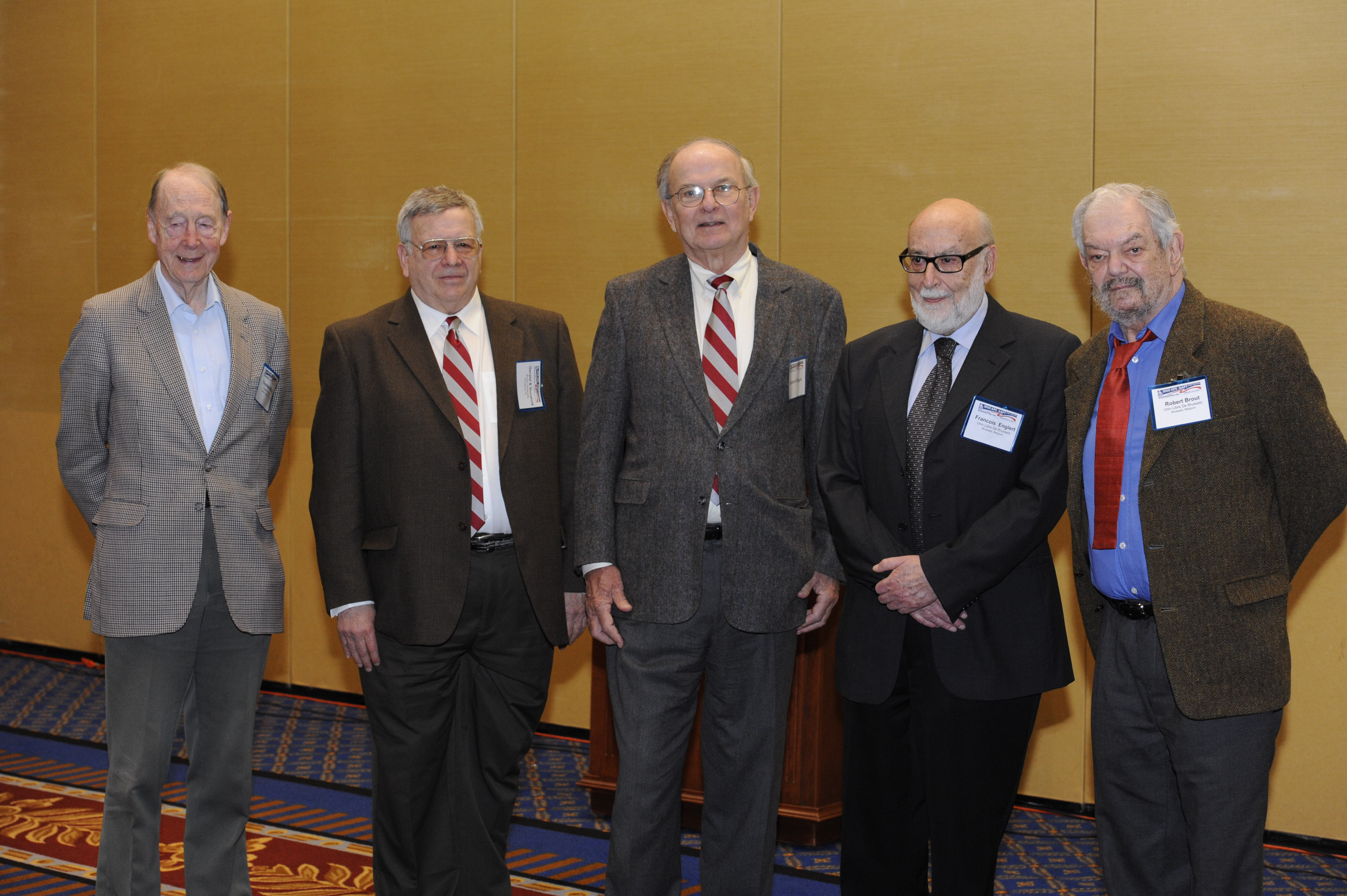
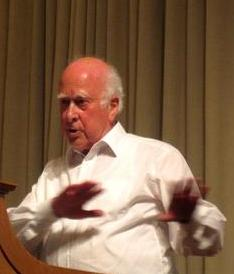

The six authors of the 1964 PRL papers, who received the 2010 J. J. Sakurai Prize for their work. From left to right: Kibble, Guralnik, Hagen, Englert, Brout. Right: Higgs.

Particle physicists study matter made from fundamental particles whose interactions are mediated by exchange particles known as force carriers. At the beginning of the 1960s a number of these particles had been discovered or proposed, along with theories suggesting how they relate to each other, some of which had already been reformulated as field theories in which the objects of study are not particles and forces, but quantum fields and their symmetries. However, attempts to unify known fundamental forces such as the electromagnetic force and the weak nuclear force were known to be incomplete. One known omission was that gauge invariant approaches, including non-abelian models such as Yang–Mills theory (1954), which held great promise for unified theories, also seemed to predict known massive particles as massless. Goldstone's theorem, relating to continuous symmetries within some theories, also appeared to rule out many obvious solutions, since it appeared to show that zero-mass particles would have to also exist that were "simply not seen". According to Gerald Guralnik, physicists had "no understanding" how these problems could be overcome in 1964. In 2014, Guralnik and Carl Hagen wrote a paper that contended that even after 50 years there is still widespread misunderstanding, by physicists and the Nobel Committee, of the Goldstone boson role. This paper, published in Modern Physics Letters A, turned out to be Guralnik's last published work.

Particle physicist and mathematician Peter Woit summarised the state of research at the time:

"Yang and Mills work on non-abelian gauge theory had one huge problem: in perturbation theory it has massless particles which don't correspond to anything we see. One way of getting rid of this problem is now fairly well-understood, the phenomenon of confinement realized in QCD, where the strong interactions get rid of the massless "gluon" states at long distances. By the very early sixties, people had begun to understand another source of massless particles: spontaneous symmetry breaking of a continuous symmetry. What Philip Anderson realized and worked out in the summer of 1962 was that, when you have both gauge symmetry and spontaneous symmetry breaking, the Nambu–Goldstone massless mode can combine with the massless gauge field modes to produce a physical massive vector field. This is what happens in superconductivity, a subject about which Anderson was (and is) one of the leading experts." [text condensed]

The Higgs mechanism is a process by which vector bosons can get rest mass without explicitly breaking gauge invariance, as a byproduct of spontaneous symmetry breaking. The mathematical theory behind spontaneous symmetry breaking was initially conceived and published within particle physics by Yoichiro Nambu in 1960, the concept that such a mechanism could offer a possible solution for the "mass problem" was originally suggested in 1962 by Philip Anderson, and Abraham Klein and Benjamin Lee showed in March 1964 that Goldstone's theorem could be avoided this way in at least some non-relativistic cases and speculated it might be possible in truly relativistic cases.

These approaches were quickly developed into a full relativistic model, independently and almost simultaneously, by three groups of physicists: by François Englert and Robert Brout in August 1964; by Peter Higgs in October 1964; and by Gerald Guralnik, Carl Hagen, and Tom Kibble (GHK) in November 1964. Higgs also wrote a response published in September 1964 to an objection by Walter Gilbert, which showed that if calculating within the radiation gauge, Goldstone's theorem and Gilbert's objection would become inapplicable. (Note: Goldstone's theorem only applies to gauges having manifest Lorentz covariance, a condition that took time to become questioned. But the process of quantisation requires a gauge to be fixed and at this point it becomes possible to choose a gauge such as the 'radiation' gauge which is not invariant over time, so that these problems can be avoided.) (Higgs later described Gilbert's objection as prompting his own paper.) Properties of the model were further considered by Guralnik in 1965, by Higgs in 1966, by Kibble in 1967, and further by GHK in 1967. The original three 1964 papers showed that when a gauge theory is combined with an additional field that spontaneously breaks the symmetry, the gauge bosons can consistently acquire a finite mass. In 1967, Steven Weinberg and Abdus Salam independently showed how a Higgs mechanism could be used to break the electroweak symmetry of Sheldon Glashow's unified model for the weak and electromagnetic interactions (itself an extension of work by Julian Schwinger), forming what became the Standard Model of particle physics. Weinberg was the first to observe that this would also provide mass terms for the fermions. (Note: A field with the "Mexican hat" potential $V(\phi)=\mu^2\phi^2 + \lambda\phi^4$ and $\mu^2 < 0$ has a minimum not at zero but at some non-zero value $\phi_0$. By expressing the action in terms of the field $\tilde \phi=\phi-\phi_0$ (where $\phi_0$ is a constant independent of position), we find the Yukawa term has a component $g\phi_0 \bar\psi\psi$. Since both $g$ and $\phi_0$ are constants, this looks exactly like the mass term for a fermion of mass $g\phi_0$. The field $\tilde\phi$ is then the Higgs field.)

However, the seminal papers on spontaneous breaking of gauge symmetries were at first largely ignored, because it was widely believed that the (non-Abelian gauge) theories in question were a dead-end, and in particular that they could not be renormalised. In 1971–1972, Martinus J, G, Veltman and Gerard 't Hooft proved renormalisation of Yang–Mills was possible in two papers covering massless, and then massive, fields. Their contribution, and others' work on the renormalization group, was eventually "enormously profound and influential", but even with all key elements of the eventual theory published there was still almost no wider interest. For example, Sidney Coleman found in a study that "essentially no-one paid any attention" to Weinberg's paper prior to 1971 – now the most cited in particle physics – and even in 1970 according to David Politzer, Glashow's teaching of the weak interaction contained no mention of Weinberg's, Salam's, or Glashow's own work. In practice, Politzer states, almost everyone learned of the theory due to physicist Benjamin Lee, who combined the work of Veltman and 't Hooft with insights by others, and popularised the completed theory. In this way, from 1971, interest and acceptance "exploded" and the ideas were quickly absorbed in the mainstream.

=== The significance of requiring manifest covariance ===
Most students who have taken a course in electromagnetism have encountered the Coulomb potential. It basically states that two charged particles attract or repel each other by a force which varies according to the inverse square of their separation. This is fairly unambiguous for particles at rest, but if one or the other is following an arbitrary trajectory the question arises whether one should compute the force using the instantaneous positions of the particles or the so-called retarded positions. The latter recognizes that information cannot propagate instantaneously, rather it propagates at the speed of light. However, the radiation gauge says that one uses the instantaneous positions of the particles, but doesn't violate causality because there are compensating terms in the force equation. In contrast, the Lorenz gauge imposes manifest covariance (and thus causality) at all stages of a calculation. Predictions of observable quantities are identical in the two gauges, but the radiation gauge formulation of quantum field theory avoids Goldstone's theorem.

=== Summary and impact of the PRL papers ===
The three papers written in 1964 were each recognised as milestone papers during Physical Review Letters's 50th anniversary celebration. Their six authors were also awarded the 2010 J. J. Sakurai Prize for Theoretical Particle Physics for this work. (A controversy also arose the same year, because in the event of a Nobel Prize only up to three scientists could be recognised, with six being credited for the papers. ) Two of the three PRL papers (by Higgs and by GHK) contained equations for the hypothetical field that eventually would become known as the Higgs field and its hypothetical quantum, the Higgs boson. Higgs's subsequent 1966 paper showed the decay mechanism of the boson; only a massive boson can decay and the decays can prove the mechanism.

Each of these papers is unique and demonstrates different approaches to showing how mass arise in gauge particles. Over the years, the differences between these papers are no longer widely understood, due to the passage of time and acceptance of end-results by the particle physics community. A study of citation indices is interesting—more than 40 years after the 1964 publication in Physical Review Letters there is little noticeable pattern of preference among them, with the vast majority of researchers in the field mentioning all three milestone papers.

In the paper by Higgs the boson is massive, and in a closing sentence Higgs writes that "an essential feature" of the theory "is the prediction of incomplete multiplets of scalar and vector bosons". (Frank Close comments that 1960s gauge theorists were focused on the problem of massless vector bosons, and the implied existence of a massive scalar boson was not seen as important; only Higgs directly addressed it.) In the paper by GHK the boson is massless and decoupled from the massive states. In reviews dated 2009 and 2011, Guralnik states that in the GHK model the boson is massless only in a lowest-order approximation, but it is not subject to any constraint and acquires mass at higher orders, and adds that the GHK paper was the only one to show that there are no massless Goldstone bosons in the model and to give a complete analysis of the general Higgs mechanism. All three reached similar conclusions, despite their very different approaches: Higgs' paper essentially used classical techniques, Englert and Brout's involved calculating vacuum polarization in perturbation theory around an assumed symmetry-breaking vacuum state, and GHK used operator formalism and conservation laws to explore in depth the ways in which Goldstone's theorem explicitly fails.

In addition to explaining how mass is acquired by vector bosons, the Higgs mechanism also predicts the ratio between the W boson and Z boson masses as well as their couplings with each other and with the Standard Model quarks and leptons. Subsequently, many of these predictions have been verified by precise measurements performed at the Large Electron-Positron Collider (LEP) and the Standford Linear Collider (SLC) colliders, thus overwhelmingly confirming that some kind of Higgs mechanism does take place in nature, but the exact manner by which it happens has not yet been discovered. The results of searching for the Higgs boson are expected to provide evidence about how this is realized in nature.

=== Consequences of the papers ===
The resulting electroweak theory and Standard Model have correctly predicted (among other discoveries) weak neutral currents, three bosons, the top and charm quarks, and with great precision, the mass and other properties of some of these. (Note: The success of the Higgs based electroweak theory and Standard Model is illustrated by their predictions of the mass of two particles later detected: the W boson (predicted mass: 80.390±0.018 GeV/c^{2}, experimental measurement: 80.387±0.019 GeV/c^{2}), and the Z boson (predicted mass: 91.1874±0.0021 GeV/c^{2}, experimental measurement: 91.1876±0.0021 GeV/c^{2}). The existence of the Z boson was itself another prediction. Other correct predictions included the weak neutral current, the gluon, and the top and charm quarks, all later proven to exist as the theory said.) Many of those involved eventually won Nobel Prizes or other renowned awards. A 1974 paper in Reviews of Modern Physics commented that "while no one doubted the [mathematical] correctness of these arguments, no one quite believed that nature was diabolically clever enough to take advantage of them". By 1986 and again in the 1990s it became possible to write that understanding and proving the Higgs sector of the Standard Model was "the central problem today in particle physics."

== See also ==
- Symmetry breaking
- Large Hadron Collider
- Fermilab
- Tevatron
- The God Particle, a popular science book on the Higgs boson, written by Leon M. Lederman
