= Classical Mechanics (Goldstein) =

Advanced undergraduate or graduate textbook

- Front cover of the third edition
- Author: Herbert Goldstein
- Language: English
- Subject: Classical mechanics
- Genre: Non-fiction
- Publisher: Addison-Wesley
- Publication date: 1951, 1980, 2002
- Publication place: United States of America
- Media type: Print
- Pages: xviii + 638
- ISBN: 978-0-201-65702-9

Classical Mechanics is a textbook written by Herbert Goldstein, a professor at Columbia University. Intended for advanced undergraduate and beginning graduate students, it has been one of the standard references on its subject around the world since its first publication in 1950.

== Overview ==
In the second edition, Goldstein corrected all the errors that had been pointed out, added a new chapter on perturbation theory, a new section on Bertrand's theorem, and another on Noether's theorem. Other arguments and proofs were simplified and supplemented.

Before the death of its primary author in 2005, a new (third) edition of the book was released, with the collaboration of Charles P. Poole and John L. Safko from the University of South Carolina. In the third edition, the book discusses at length various mathematically sophisticated reformulations of Newtonian mechanics, namely analytical mechanics, as applied to particles, rigid bodies and continua. In addition, it covers in some detail classical electromagnetism, special relativity, and field theory, both classical and relativistic. There is an appendix on group theory. New to the third edition include a chapter on nonlinear dynamics and chaos, a section on the exact solutions to the three-body problem obtained by Euler and Lagrange, and a discussion of the damped driven pendulum that explains the Josephson junctions. This is counterbalanced by the reduction of several existing chapters motivated by the desire to prevent this edition from exceeding the previous one in length. For example, the discussions of Hermitian and unitary matrices were omitted because they are more relevant to quantum mechanics rather than classical mechanics, while those of Routh's procedure and time-independent perturbation theory were reduced.

== Table of Contents (3rd Edition) ==
- Preface
- Chapter 1: Survey of Elementary Principles
- Chapter 2: Variational Principles and Lagrange's Equations
- Chapter 3: The Central Force Problem
- Chapter 4: The Kinematics of Rigid Body Motion
- Chapter 5: The Rigid Body Equations of Motion
- Chapter 6: Oscillations
- Chapter 7: The Classical Mechanics of the Special Theory of Relativity
- Chapter 8: The Hamilton Equations of Motion
- Chapter 9: Canonical Transformations
- Chapter 10: Hamilton–Jacobi Theory and Action-Angle Coordinates
- Chapter 11: Classical Chaos
- Chapter 12: Canonical Perturbation Theory
- Chapter 13: Introduction to the Lagrangian and Hamiltonian Formulations for Continuous Systems and Fields
- Appendix A: Euler Angles in Alternate Conventions and Cayley–Klein Parameters
- Appendix B: Groups and Algebras
- Appendix C: Solutions to Select Exercises
- Select Bibliography
- Author Index
- Subject Index

== Editions ==
1. Goldstein, Herbert (1950). Classical Mechanics (1st ed.). Addison-Wesley.
2. Goldstein, Herbert (1951). Classical Mechanics (1st ed.). Addison-Wesley. ASIN B000OL8LOM.
3. Goldstein, Herbert (1980). Classical Mechanics (2nd ed.). Addison-Wesley. ISBN 978-0-201-02918-5.
4. Goldstein, Herbert; Poole, C. P.; Safko, J. L. (2001). Classical Mechanics (3rd ed.). Addison-Wesley. ISBN 978-0-201-65702-9.

== Reception ==
=== First edition ===
S.L. Quimby of Columbia University noted that the first half of the first edition of the book is dedicated to the development of Lagrangian mechanics with the treatment of velocity-dependent potentials, which are important in electromagnetism, and the use of the Cayley-Klein parameters and matrix algebra for rigid-body dynamics. This is followed by a comprehensive and clear discussion of Hamiltonian mechanics. End-of-chapter references improve the value of the book. Quimby pointed out that although this book is suitable for students preparing for quantum mechanics, it is not helpful for those interested in analytical mechanics because its treatment omits too much. Quimby praised the quality of printing and binding which make the book attractive.

In the Journal of the Franklin Institute, Rupen Eskergian noted that the first edition of Classical Mechanics offers a mature take on the subject using vector and tensor notations and with a welcome emphasis on variational methods. This book begins with a review of elementary concepts, then introduces the principle of virtual work, constraints, generalized coordinates, and Lagrangian mechanics. Scattering is treated in the same chapter as central forces and the two-body problem. Unlike most other books on mechanics, this one elaborates upon the virial theorem. The discussion of canonical and contact transformations, the Hamilton-Jacobi theory, and action-angle coordinates is followed by a presentation of geometric optics and wave mechanics. Eskergian believed this book serves as a bridge to modern physics.

Writing for The Mathematical Gazette on the first edition, L. Rosenhead congratulated Goldstein for a lucid account of classical mechanics leading to modern theoretical physics, which he believed would stand the test of time alongside acknowledged classics such as E.T. Whittaker's Analytical Dynamics and Arnold Sommerfeld's Lectures on Theoretical Physics. This book is self-contained and is suitable for students who have completed courses in mathematics and physics of the first two years of university. End-of-chapter references with comments and some example problems enhance the book. Rosenhead also liked the diagrams, index, and printing.

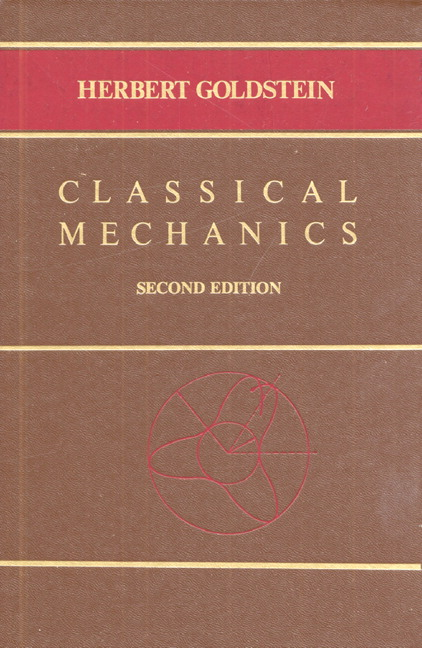
Front cover of the second edition.

Concerning the second printing of the first edition, Vic Twersky of the Mathematical Research Group at New York University considered the book to be of pedagogical merit because it explains things in a clear and simple manner, and its humor is not forced. Published in the 1950s, this book replaced the outdated and fragmented treatises and supplements typically assigned to beginning graduate students as a modern text on classical mechanics with exercises and examples demonstrating the link between this and other branches of physics, including acoustics, electrodynamics, thermodynamics, geometric optics, and quantum mechanics. It also has a chapter on the mechanics of fields and continua. At the end of each chapter, there is a list of references with the author's candid reviews of each. Twersky said that Goldstein's Classical Mechanics is more suitable for physicists compared to the much older treatise Analytical Dynamics by E.T. Whittaker, which he deemed more appropriate for mathematicians.

E. W. Banhagel, an instructor from Detroit, Michigan, observed that despite requiring no more than multivariable and vector calculus, the first edition of Classical Mechanics successfully introduces some sophisticated new ideas in physics to students. Mathematical tools are introduced as needed. He believed that the annotated references at the end of each chapter are of great value.

=== Third edition ===
Stephen R. Addison from the University of Central Arkansas commented that while the first edition of Classical Mechanics was essentially a treatise with exercises, the third has become less scholarly and more of a textbook. This book is most useful for students who are interested in learning the necessary material in preparation for quantum mechanics. The presentation of most materials in the third edition remain unchanged compared to that of the second, though many of the old references and footnotes were removed. Sections on the relations between the action-angle coordinates and the Hamilton-Jacobi equation with the old quantum theory, wave mechanics, and geometric optics were removed. Chapter 7, which deals with special relativity, has been heavily revised and could prove to be more useful to students who want to study general relativity than its equivalent in previous editions. Chapter 11 provides a clear, if somewhat dated, survey of classical chaos. Appendix B could help advanced students refresh their memories but may be too short to learn from. In all, Addison believed that this book remains a classic text on the eighteenth- and nineteenth-century approaches to theoretical mechanics; those interested in a more modern approach—expressed in the language of differential geometry and Lie groups—should refer to Mathematical Methods of Classical Mechanics by Vladimir Arnold.

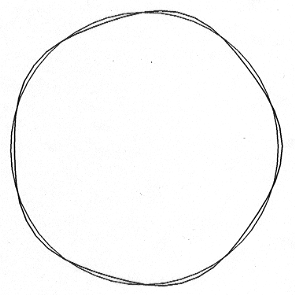
Corrected Figure 3.13. Original caption: Orbit for motion in a central force deviating slightly from a circular orbit for $\beta = 5$.

Martin Tiersten from the City University of New York pointed out a serious error in the book that persisted in all three editions and even got promoted to the front cover of the book. Such a closed orbit, depicted in a diagram on page 80 (as Figure 3.7) is impossible for an attractive central force because the path cannot be concave away from the center of force. A similarly erroneous diagram appears on page 91 (as Figure 3.13). Tiersten suggested that the reason why this error remained unnoticed for so long is because advanced mechanics texts typically do not use vectors in their treatment of central-force problems, in particular the tangential and normal components of the acceleration vector. He wrote, "Because an attractive force is always directed in toward the center of force, the direction toward the center of curvature at the turning points must be toward the center of force." In response, Poole and Safko acknowledged the error and stated they were working on a list of errata.

== See also ==
- An Introduction to Mechanics (Kleppner and Kolenkow)
- Classical Mechanics (Kibble and Berkshire)
- Course of Theoretical Physics Volume 1 (Landau and Lifshitz)
- List of textbooks on classical and quantum mechanics
