= Tom Kibble =

British physicist (1932–2016)

Sir Tom Kibble CBE FRS MAE
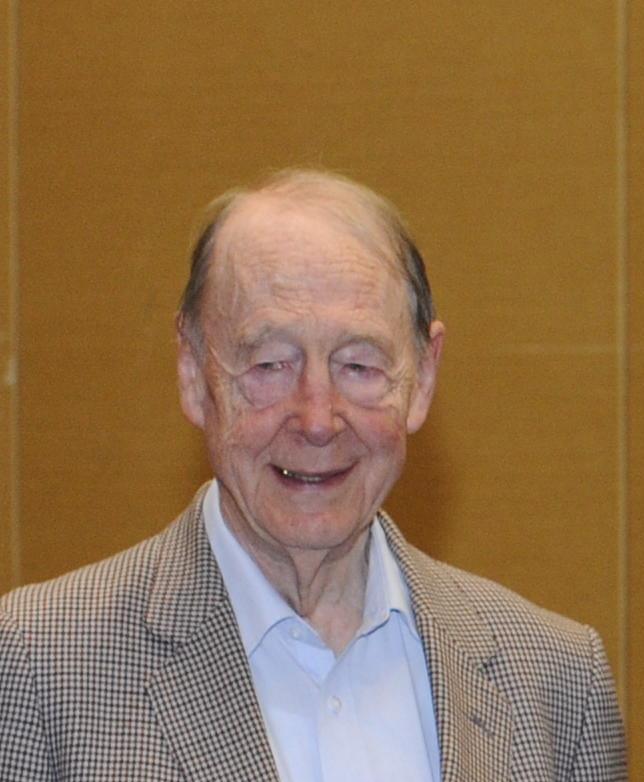
- Born: Thomas Walter Bannerman Kibble; 23 December 1932; Madras, Madras Presidency, British India
- Died: 2 June 2016 (aged 83); London, England
- Education: University of Edinburgh (BSc, MA, PhD)
- Known for: Einstein–Cartan–Sciama–Kibble theory Kibble–Zurek mechanism Higgs boson Higgs mechanism Cosmic strings Spontaneous symmetry breaking
- Awards: FRS (1980); Hughes Medal (1981); Rutherford Medal and Prize (1984); Guthrie Medal and Prize (1993); Sakurai Prize (2010); Dirac Medal (2013); Albert Einstein Medal (2014); Isaac Newton Medal (2016)
- Scientific career
- Fields: Theoretical physics Quantum field theory
- Workplaces: Imperial College London
- Thesis: Topics in quantum field theory: 1. Schwinger's action principle; 2. Dispersion relations for inelastic scattering processes (1958)
- Doctoral advisor: John Polkinghorne
- Doctoral students: John W. Barrett; Seifallah Randjbar-Daemi; Jonathan Ashmore

Sir Thomas Walter Bannerman Kibble CBE FRS MAE (/ˈkɪbəl/; 23 December 1932 – 2 June 2016) was a British theoretical physicist, senior research investigator at the Blackett Laboratory and Emeritus Professor of Theoretical Physics at Imperial College London. His research interests were in quantum field theory, especially the interface between high-energy particle physics and cosmology. He is best known as one of the first to describe the Higgs mechanism, and for his research on topological defects. From the 1950s he was concerned about the nuclear arms race and from 1970 took leading roles in promoting the social responsibility of the scientist.

== Early life and education ==
Kibble was born in Madras, in the Madras Presidency of British India, on 23 December 1932. He was the son of the statistician Walter F. Kibble, and the grandson of William Bannerman, an officer in the Indian Medical Service, and the author Helen Bannerman. His father was a mathematics professor at Madras Christian College, and Kibble grew up playing on the grounds of the college and solving mathematics puzzles his father gave him. He was educated at Doveton Corrie School in Madras and then in Edinburgh, Scotland, at Melville College and at the University of Edinburgh. He graduated from the University of Edinburgh with a BSc in 1955, MA in 1956 and a PhD in 1958.

== Career ==
Kibble worked on mechanisms of symmetry breaking, phase transitions and the topological defects (monopoles, cosmic strings or domain walls) that can be formed.

He is most noted for his co-discovery of the Higgs mechanism and Higgs boson with Gerald Guralnik and C. R. Hagen. As part of Physical Review Letters 50th anniversary celebration, the journal recognised this discovery as one of the milestone papers in PRL history. He was awarded the American Physical Society's 2010 J. J. Sakurai Prize for Theoretical Particle Physics.

While Guralnik, Hagen, and Kibble are widely considered to have authored the most complete of the early papers on the Higgs theory, they were controversially not included in the 2013 Nobel Prize in Physics.

In 2014, Nobel Laureate Peter Higgs expressed disappointment that Kibble had not been chosen to share the Nobel Prize with François Englert and himself.

Kibble pioneered the study of topological defect generation in the early universe. The paradigmatic mechanism of defect formation across a second-order phase transition is known as the Kibble-Zurek mechanism. His paper on cosmic strings introduced the phenomenon into modern cosmology.

He was one of the two co-chairs of an interdisciplinary research programme funded by the European Science Foundation (ESF) on Cosmology in the Laboratory (COSLAB) which ran from 2001 to 2005. He was previously the coordinator of an ESF Network on Topological Defects in Particle Physics, Condensed Matter & Cosmology (TOPDEF).

=== Awards and honours ===
Kibble was an elected Fellow of the Royal Society (FRS) in 1980, of the Institute of Physics (1991), and of Imperial College London (2009). He was also a member of the American Physical Society (1958), the European Physical Society (1975) and the Academia Europaea (2000). In 2008, Kibble was named an Outstanding Referee by the American Physical Society.

In addition to the Sakurai Prize, Kibble has been awarded the Hughes Medal (1981) of the Royal Society, the Rutherford (1984) and Guthrie Medals (1993) of the Institute of Physics, the Dirac Medal (2013), the Albert Einstein Medal (2014) and the Royal Medal of the Royal Society of Edinburgh (2014).

He was appointed a CBE in the 1998 Birthday Honours and was knighted in the 2014 Birthday Honours for services to physics.

Kibble was posthumously awarded the Isaac Newton Medal by the Institute of Physics for his outstanding lifelong commitment to the field.

== Publications ==
In 1966, Kibble authored a textbook, Classical Mechanics, from the 3rd edition onwards with Frank H. Berkshire. which as of 2016 is still in print and is now in its 5th edition.

== Personal life and voluntary roles ==
Kibble was married to Anne Allan from 1957 until her death in 2005. Kibble had three children.

In the 1950s and 1960s, Kibble became concerned about the nuclear arms race and from 1970 he took leading roles in several organisations promoting scientists' social responsibility. In the period 1970–1977, he was a national committee member, then treasurer, then chair of the British Society for Social Responsibility in Science; from 1976 he was a trustee of the Science and Society Trust; from 1981 to 1991 he was a national coordinating committee member, then vice-chair, then chair of Scientists against Nuclear Arms; he was a sponsor of Scientists for Global Responsibility; and from 1988 he was chair, and later a trustee, of the Martin Ryle Trust. He was chair of the organising committee of the Second International Scientists' Congress, held at Imperial College in 1988, and was a co-editor of the proceedings.

In retirement, Kibble chaired the Richmond branch of the Ramblers Association.

He died in London on 2 June 2016 at the age of 83.
