= C. R. Hagen =

American physicist (born 1937)

Carl Richard Hagen
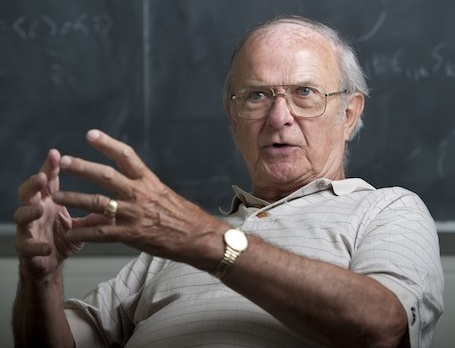
- Born: February 2, 1937 (age 89); Chicago, Illinois, U.S.
- Education: MIT (BS, MS, PhD); Luther High School North
- Known for: Symmetry breaking Higgs boson Higgs mechanism Higher-spin theory
- Awards: Sakurai Prize (2010), APS Fellow
- Scientific career
- Fields: Particle physics Quantum field theory Mathematical physics
- Workplaces: University of Rochester; Imperial College London; American University of Beirut; International Centre for Theoretical Physics; Aspen Center for Physics
- Doctoral advisor: Kenneth Alan Johnson, MIT

Carl Richard Hagen (/ˈheɪɡən/; born February 2, 1937) is an American physicist and Professor Emeritus of particle physics at the University of Rochester. He is most noted for his contributions to the Standard Model and Symmetry breaking as well as the 1964 co-discovery of the Higgs mechanism and Higgs boson (God Particle) with Gerald Guralnik and Tom Kibble (GHK). As part of Physical Review Letters 50th anniversary celebration, the journal recognized this discovery as one of the milestone papers in PRL history. While widely considered to have authored the most complete of the early papers on the Higgs theory, GHK were controversially not included in the 2013 Nobel Prize in Physics.

In 2010, Hagen was awarded The American Physical Society's J. J. Sakurai Prize for Theoretical Particle Physics for the "elucidation of the properties of spontaneous symmetry breaking in four-dimensional relativistic gauge theory and of the mechanism for the consistent generation of vector boson masses".

Hagen's research interests are in the field of theoretical high-energy physics, primarily in the area of quantum field theory. This includes the formulation and quantization of higher spin field theories within the context of Galilean relativity as well as that of Special relativity. Work in recent years has been concerned with such topics as the soluble two-dimensional theories, Chern–Simons field theory, the Aharonov–Bohm effect, and the Casimir effect. In 2015, Hagen authored a paper that found the classic 17th century Wallis formula for π while calculating energy levels of the Hydrogen atom – the first paper to derive π from physics and quantum mechanics.

Born and raised in Chicago, Hagen received his B.S., M.S., and Ph.D. in physics from the Massachusetts Institute of Technology. At MIT, his doctoral thesis topic was in quantum electrodynamics. He has been a professor of physics at the University of Rochester since 1963. Hagen won the Award for Excellence in Teaching, Department of Physics and Astronomy, University of Rochester twice (in 1996 and 1999). Hagen is a Fellow of the American Physical Society and was named Outstanding Referee by APS in 2008. Valparaiso University awarded Hagen the degree Honorary Doctor of Science in 2012 for his significant contributions to particle physics and the theory of mass generation.

== See also ==
- J. J. Sakurai Prize for Theoretical Particle Physics
- Higgs mechanism
- Higgs boson
- Standard Model
- Spontaneous symmetry breaking
- 1964 PRL symmetry breaking papers
- MIT Physics Department
- Norwegian Americans
- Large Hadron Collider
- Fermilab
- Tevatron
- Wallis product
- The God Particle: If the Universe Is the Answer, What Is the Question?, a popular science book by Leon M. Lederman
