= Gerald Guralnik =

American physicist (1936–2014)

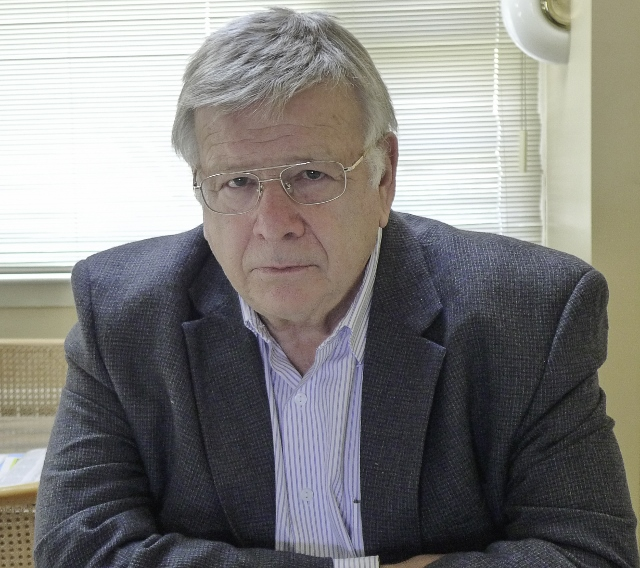
- Gerald Stanford Guralnik
- Born: September 17, 1936; Cedar Falls, Iowa
- Died: April 26, 2014 (aged 77); Providence, Rhode Island
- Education: MIT (BS); Harvard University, PhD
- Known for: Spontaneous symmetry breaking; Higgs Boson; Higgs mechanism
- Awards: Sakurai Prize (2010); APS fellow; Sloan fellow
- Scientific career
- Fields: Physics; Computational physics Quantum field theory
- Workplaces: Brown University; University of Rochester; Imperial College London; Los Alamos National Laboratory
- Doctoral advisor: Walter Gilbert

Gerald Stanford "Gerry" Guralnik (/ɡʊˈrælnɪk/; September 17, 1936 – April 26, 2014) was the Chancellor’s Professor of Physics at Brown University. In 1964, he co-discovered the Higgs mechanism and Higgs boson with C. R. Hagen and Tom Kibble (GHK). As part of Physical Review Letters' 50th anniversary celebration, the journal recognized this discovery as one of the milestone papers in PRL history. While widely considered to have authored the most complete of the early papers on the Higgs theory, GHK were controversially not included in the 2013 Nobel Prize in Physics.

In 2010, Guralnik was awarded the American Physical Society's J. J. Sakurai Prize for Theoretical Particle Physics for the "elucidation of the properties of spontaneous symmetry breaking in four-dimensional relativistic gauge theory and of the mechanism for the consistent generation of vector boson masses".

Guralnik received his B.S. degree from the Massachusetts Institute of Technology in 1958 and his Ph.D. degree from Harvard University in 1964. He went to Imperial College London as a postdoctoral fellow supported by the National Science Foundation and then became a postdoctoral fellow at the University of Rochester. In the fall of 1967 Guralnik went to Brown University and frequently visited Imperial College and Los Alamos National Laboratory where he was a staff member from 1985 to 1987. While at Los Alamos, he did extensive work on the development and application of computational methods for lattice QCD.

Guralnik died of a heart attack at age 77 in 2014.

== See also ==
- 1964 PRL symmetry breaking papers
- Higgs mechanism
- Higgs boson
