= Physical Review Letters =

Academic journal in physics

- Discipline: Physics
- Language: English
- Edited by: Rafael Fernandes; Robert Garisto; Abhishek Agarwal; Serena Dalena; Samindranath Mitra

Publication details
- History: 1958–present
- Publisher: American Physical Society (United States)
- Frequency: Weekly
- Open access: partial
- License: CC-BY 4.0 International license
- Impact factor: 9.4 (2025)

Standard abbreviations
- ISO 4: Phys. Rev. Lett.

Indexing
- CODEN: PRLTAO
- ISSN: 0031-9007 (print); 1079-7114 (web)
- LCCN: 59037543
- OCLC no.: 1715834
- CD-ROM issue
- ISSN: 1092-0145

Links
- Journal homepage; Archives

Physical Review Letters (PRL), established in 1958, is a peer-reviewed, scientific journal that is published 52 times per year by the American Physical Society. The journal is considered one of the most prestigious in the field of physics. Over a quarter of Physics Nobel Prize-winning papers between 1995 and 2017 were published in it.

PRL is published both online and as a print journal. Its focus is on short articles ("letters") for a broad readership. The Lead Editor (main science advisor) is Rafael Fernandes. The Chief Editor (responsible for the journal content), is Robert Garisto.

== History ==
The journal was created in 1958, by Samuel Goudsmit, who was then the editor of Physical Review, the American Physical Society's primary journal. He turned the Letters to the Editor section of Physical Review into a new standalone flagship journal: Physical Review Letters. It was the first journal dedicated to the rapid publication of short articles, a format that later gained widespread adoption across other disciplines.

=== Notable articles ===
- 1964 PRL symmetry breaking papers
- First report of a functional scanning tunneling microscope (1982)
- Invention of the atomic force microscope (1986)
- First direct observation of gravitational waves (2016)
- A list of PRLs cited for recent Nobel prizes.

== Scope ==
PRL covers all areas of physics and related topics. The journal is divided into the following sections:

- Quantum Information, Science, and Technology
- Cosmology, Astrophysics, and Gravitation
- Particles and Fields
- Nuclear Physics
- Atomic, Molecular, and Optical Physics
- Physics of Fluids, Earth & Planetary Science, and Climate
- Plasma and Solar Physics, Accelerators and Beams
- Condensed Matter and Materials
- Statistical Physics; Classical, Nonlinear, and Complex Systems
- Polymers, Chemical Physics, Soft Matter, Biological Physics

A section before the table of contents highlights a small number of particularly notable articles in each edition.

== Journal ranking summary ==
The following table presents the most recent journal ranking metrics for Physical Review Letters based on data from Scopus and Web of Science categories.

Journal ranking summary (2023)

Source	Category	Rank	Percentile	Quartile
Scopus	General Physics and Astronomy in Physics and Astronomy	13/243	94.65	Q1
Web of Science (IF)	Physics, Multidisciplinary	9/112	91.96	Q1
Web of Science (JCI)	Physics, Multidisciplinary	7/112	93.75	Q1

== Abstracting, indexing, and impact factor ==
Physical Review Letters is indexed in the following bibliographic databases:

- Chemical Abstracts
- Computer & Control Abstracts
- Current Physics Index
- Electrical & Electronics Index
- Energy Research Abstracts
- GeoRef
- INSPEC
- International Aerospace Abstracts
- Mathematical Reviews
- Medline
- Metals Abstracts
- Nuclear Science Abstracts
- Physics Abstracts
- PubSCIENCE
- SPIN
- World Aluminum Abstracts

== See also ==
- Science
- Nature
- Proceedings of the National Academy of Sciences
