= Flag code =

Flag code may refer to:

- Flag protocol, such as
  - Flag Code of India
  - United States Flag Code
- Flag signals, such as
  - International maritime signal flags
- "flag code", informal name for GS1 country code component of barcodes
- Bit field, set of computer bits used as Boolean flags
