= Flag protocol =

Protocol regarding the display and handling of flags

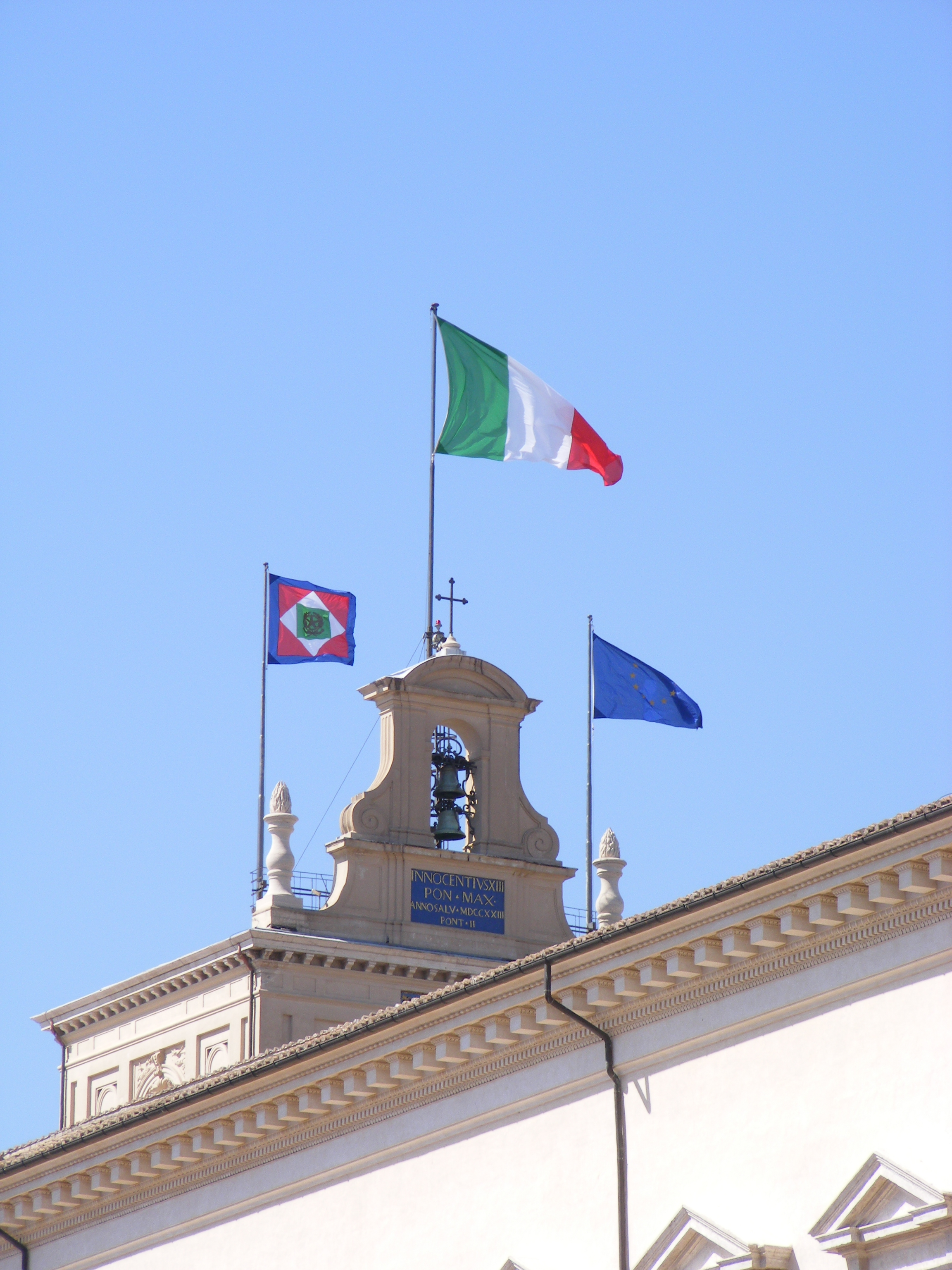
The Italian flag flying on the top of the Quirinal Palace, Rome, Italy, the main official residence of the President of the Italian Republic. From left to right, the presidential standard of Italy, the flag of Italy and the flag of the European Union.

A flag protocol (or flag code) is a set of rules and regulations for the display of flags within a country, including national, subnational, and foreign flags. Generally, flag protocols call for the national flag to be the most prominent flag (i.e., in the position of honor), flown highest and to its own right (the viewer's left) and for the flag to never touch the ground. Enforcement of flag protocols vary by nation, with some countries using flag protocols as recommendations and guidelines, while some countries enforce the violations of flag protocol with civil or criminal penalties.

== General guidelines ==
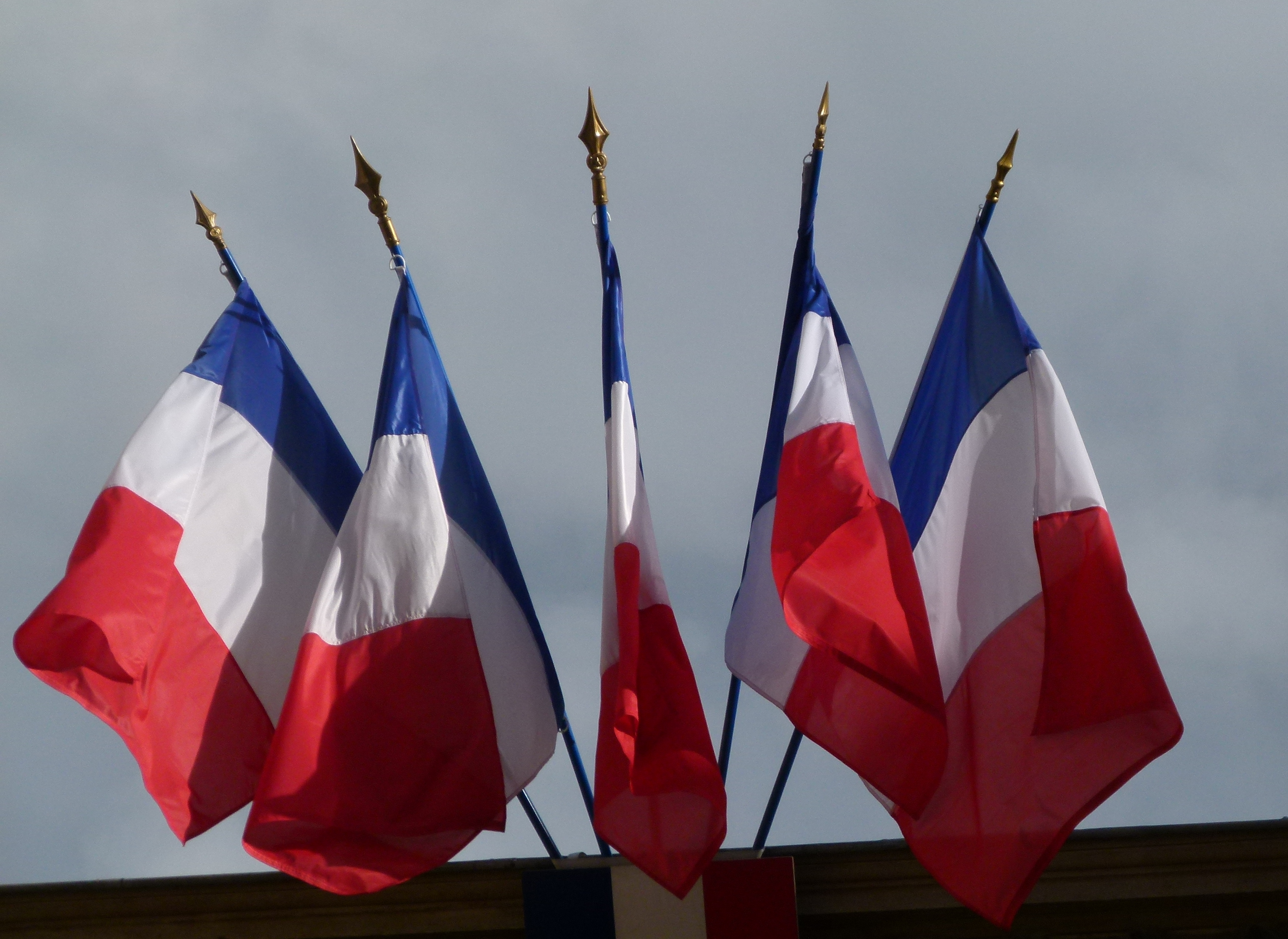
Multiple French flags as commonly flown from public buildings

The following guidelines are generally used between all countries.

=== Position of honor ===
Typically the national flag of the country in which it is being displayed is given the position of honor. Following the national flags, flags of sub-federal divisions (such as states or provinces) typically follow and then other flags such as for armed forces or personal flags.

In the case of foreign nations, the host country receives highest precedence, and other national flags are displayed in alphabetical order. This position of highest precedence is at the same height as other national flags; no nation's flag should be displayed higher than that of another nation in times of peace.

The position of honor is centered or to the flag's own right (a viewer's left). When carried in single file (such as for color guard), the flag of honor leads.

When two poles are crossed, the position of honor is the flag that ends on the left side from the point of view of an observer (the pole will therefore end on the right). In a semicircle, the position of honor is the center. If a full circle is used outside an entrance, the position of honor is directly over the entrance. If used to line the walls of a room, the flag should be placed directly opposite the entrance. When placed with a podium or at a place of worship, the flag should hang directly behind or on a pole to the right of the speaker, from the point of view of the flag.

On a vehicle the flag should be put on a window or affixed securely to the front of the chassis, on the nearside of the vehicle, i.e. the one opposite the driver. (In other words, in countries that drive on the right hand side of the road, a flag is on the right of the vehicle.) On a vehicle where a visiting Head of State or Government is sharing a car with the host Head of State or Government, the host's flag takes the nearside position, the guest's flag on the offside.

=== Hanging ===
When flown horizontally, as from a flag pole, the flag should be oriented so that the canton is closest to the top of the pole. If hung against a wall, the canton should be placed in the upper-left corner from the point of view of the observer.

When hung vertically, flags should be rotated so the canton is again closest to the top of the pole. If the flag is displayed against a wall, the canton should again appear in the upper-left corner, which requires that the flag be both rotated and "flipped" from its horizontal orientation.

=== On a helicopter ===
Sometimes in a ceremonial flypast, a flag is flown from a weighted rope dangling from beneath a helicopter.

== By country ==
=== Australia ===
The national flag of Australia

The Department of the Prime Minister and Cabinet issues non-binding protocols for flying the national flag and other Australian flags. Any person may fly the flag; although the department advises that "the flag should be treated with the respect and dignity it deserves as the nation’s most important national symbol". However, there is no legislation enforcing these protocols or otherwise prohibiting the desecration of the flag.

=== Belgium ===
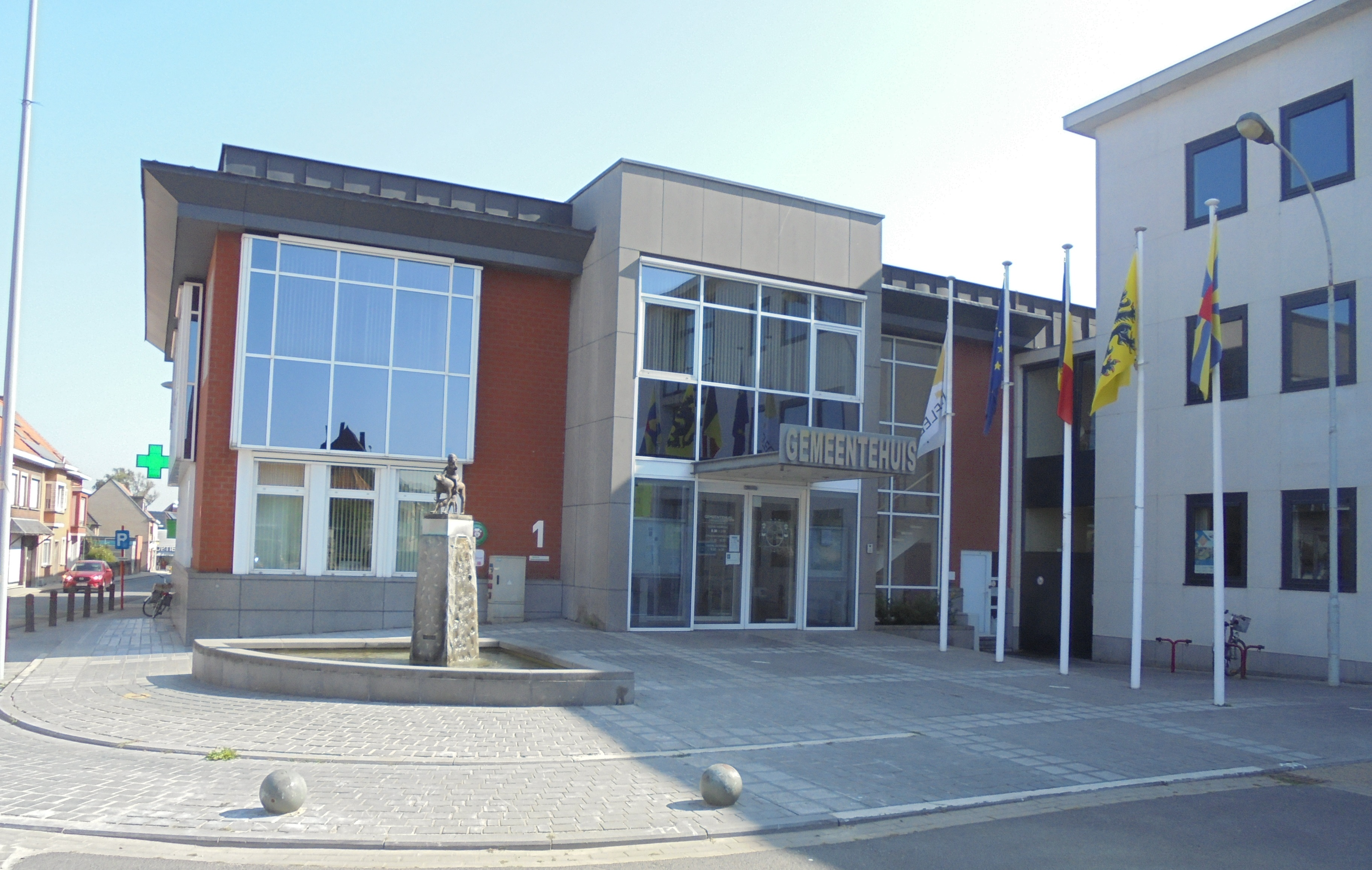
Flags and their hierarchy, here in the '5-3-1-2-4' setup

Flag protocol in Belgium is governed by a strict order of precedence defined by federal and regional decrees (such as the Flemish Government's protocol guidelines):

1. The Belgian National Flag
2. The Flag of the Community or Region (e.g., the Flemish Lion, the Walloon Rooster, or the Brussels Iris)
3. The European Flag
4. The Provincial Flag
5. The Municipal Flag

The position is determined by standing with one's back to the building (the perspective of the host), depending on the number of flags: 1-2, 2-1-3, 3-1-2-4 and 5-3-1-2-4. Some institutions prefer the four-pole configuration, as it places the Belgian flag and the Regional flag in the two central positions, which avoids having the regional flag relegated to the "side" of a single central national flag.

=== Brazil ===
The national flag of Brazil

The Brazilian flag protocol is defined by the country's federal law 5.700, from 1971. It states that the flag may only be presented:

- Hoisted on a mast or on halyards;
- Extended without a mast, be it tugged by aircraft, applied upon a wall or attached to a horizontal cable connecting buildings, trees or other structures;
- Painted onto walls, roofs, windows, vehicles or aircraft;
- Composing panoplies with other flags;
- Carried in graduations, parades or by itself;
- Extended on coffins before burial.

It may not be used:

- Upside down or on its side;
- If damaged or if made with the wrong proportions;
- As clothing, napkin, tablecloth, or veil for to-be-opened monuments and plaques;
- On any casing or wrapping for commercial products.

Other rules include: worn-out flags must be taken to a military installation to be burnt on Flag Day, a yearly national ceremony; no foreign flags may be flown without the national flag by their side, except on foreign embassies and consulates; the flag must always be illuminated during the night; it always occupies a place of honor, central and to the right when displayed with foreign flags.

=== Brunei ===
Members of the royal family and the nobility each have their own flags. The Standard of the Sultan must be flown only over Istana Nurul Iman. Only the Standard of the Sultan, the Crown Prince, the 'Viziers' and 'Cheterias' (royal nobles) will be flown every day at their respective residence. Other personal royal flags of the Pengirans and personal flags of the non-royal nobles (such as Pehin Manteris) will only be flown during a ceremonial period announced by the Prime Minister's Office such as Sultan's Birthday, Royal Wedding and National Day. The public generally will fly the national flag during these periods. As in many other countries, Bruneians consider it taboo for the flag to touch the ground.

=== Canada ===
The national flag of Canada

There are established rules for flying the National flag of Canada. For example "The National Flag will always be flown on its own flagpole...It is improper to fly the National Flag with another flag, of any type, on the same flagpole." As well as adhering to the position of honour guidelines.

With the rise of synthetic fabrics, Canada has recently revised its guidelines on the disposal of the national flag.

- Flags made of natural fibres (wool, cotton, linen) should be burned in a dignified manner, privately, without ceremony or public attention being drawn to the destruction of the material.
- Flags made of synthetic material (nylon or polyester) should not be burned due to environmental damage and potential fire hazard. They should be respectfully torn into strips, with each element of the flag reduced to a single colour, so that the remaining pieces do not resemble a flag. The individual pieces should then be placed in a bag for disposal – the shreds of fabric should not be reused or fashioned into anything.

=== France ===
The national flag of France

When a French vessel meets another French ship, it is to lower and raise its ensign as a greeting. A merchant ship meeting a ship of the French Navy will greet three times.

=== India ===
The national flag of India

The flag of India has a very distinctive protocol. It is governed by the Flag Code of India, 2002; the Emblems and Names (Prevention of Improper Use) Act, 1950; and the Prevention of Insults to National Honour Act, 1971.

Insults to the national flag result in up to three years of imprisonment as punishment, or a fine, or both.

Official regulation states that the flag must never touch the ground or water, or be used as a drapery in any form.

Disposal of damaged flags is also covered by the flag code. Damaged or soiled flags may not be cast aside or disrespectfully destroyed; they have to be destroyed as a whole and in private, preferably by burning or by any other method consistent with the dignity of the flag.

=== Italy ===
The national flag of Italy

==== Obligation to exhibit ====
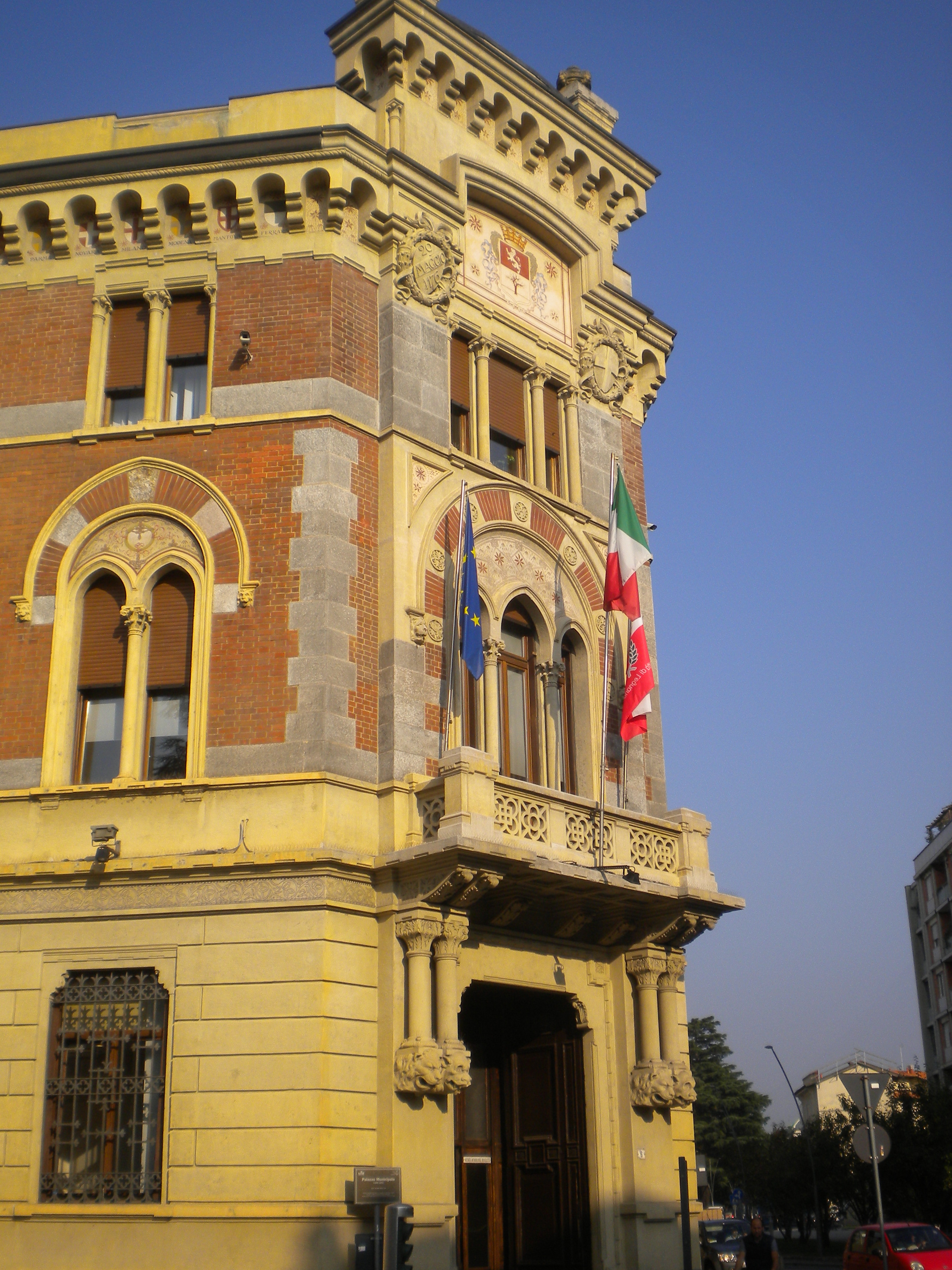
Flags displayed outside the Malinverni Palace, town hall of the Lombard city of Legnano: from left to right, the flag of the European Union, the flag of Italy and the municipal flag of the city

The law, implementing Article 12 of the Constitution and following of Italy's membership of the European Union, lays down the general provisions governing the use and display of the flag of the Italian Republic and the flag of European Union (in its territory). In particular, in public buildings the flag of the Italian Republic, the flag of the European Union and the portrait of the president of the Italian Republic must be displayed in the offices of the most important Italian institutional offices:

- a) members of the Council of Ministers and Undersecretaries of State;
- b) managers in charge of general directorates or equivalent postal services in the central administrations of the State as well as managers in charge of peripheral offices of the State having a territorial constituency no smaller than the province;
- c) holders of the highest institutional office of public bodies of national dimension, and holders of the managerial offices corresponding to those referred to in letter b);
- d) holders of the highest institutional office of the independent authorities;
- e) managers of judicial offices;
- f) heads of diplomatic representations, consular offices and Italian cultural institutes abroad. For honorary consuls the exhibition is optional.

The flag of Italy must also be displayed outside all schools of all levels, outside university complexes, outside the buildings that host the voting operations, outside the prefectures, police headquarters, palaces of justice and outside the central post offices.

The flag of Italy must also be displayed on all public offices on the Tricolour Day (7 January), the Anniversary of the Lateran Treaty (11 February), the Anniversary of the Liberation (25 April), the Labour Day (1 May), the Europe Day (9 May), the Feast of the Italian Republic (2 June), the commemoration of the Four days of Naples (28 September), the feast of the patron saint of Italy (Francis of Assisi, 4 October), United Nations Day (24 October; here the tricolour must fly together with the flag of the United Nations) and National Unity and Armed Forces Day (4 November).

When displayed alongside other flags, the flag of Italy takes the position of honour; it is raised first and lowered last. Other national flags should be arranged in alphabetical order. Where two (or more than three) flags appear together, the national flag should be placed to the right (left of the observer); in a display of three flags in line, the national flag occupies the central position. The European flag is also flown from government buildings on a daily basis. In the presence of a foreign visitor belonging to a member state, this takes precedence over the Italian flag. As a sign of mourning, flags flown externally shall be lowered to half-mast; two black ribbons may be attached to those otherwise displayed.

==== Exposure mode ====
Italian flag arranged vertically correctly

The tricolor is often accompanied by the flag of the European Union and the banners of local authorities. In the case of two flags displayed, the national flag must be placed on the right (left for those watching, i.e. the position of honour), while if the flags are in an odd number, the tricolor must be hoisted in the centre. This last provision is no longer applicable in the event that the flag of another country belonging to the European Union is displayed: in this circumstance the Italian flag gives up the central place to the EU flag.

As a rule, no more than one flag can be applied to each flagpole. An exception is the presidential standard, which is hoisted on the Torrino del Quirinale, under the tricolour, when the third pole is occupied by the flag of a host country. If there are three flagpoles available but only two flags to be displayed, the central flagpole must be left free and the order of importance of the flags must be respected.

For example, flags displayed on public buildings must appear, from the outside, in the following orders:

- (Italy) (European Union) , daily;
- (European Union) (Italy), on United Nations Day;
- (United States) (Italy) (European Union) , in the presence of a host country (not belonging to the EU);
- (France) (European Union) (Italy) , in the presence of a host country (belonging to the EU);
- (European Union) (Italy) (Lombardy) , in the regional, provincial and municipal headquarters with three flagpoles;
- (Lombardy) (Italy) (European Union), in the regional, provincial and municipal headquarters with four flagpoles;
- (European Union) (France) (Italy) (Lombardy) , in regional, provincial and municipal headquarters in the presence of a host country; (Note: If the guest's rank is equal to or higher than the host's, this order applies.)
- (European Union) (Italy) (France) (Lombardy) , in regional, provincial and municipal headquarters in the presence of a host country. (Note: If the guest's rank is lower than the host's, this order applies.)

The law also regulates their dimensions: without prejudice to the proportions of 2:3, which must always be respected, the tricolor flags displayed inside the buildings must be 100x150 cm large, with the pole 250 cm long, while those that fly outside must be 2x3 m or 3x4.5 m, with the pole 4 or 8 m high depending on whether it is installed on a balcony respectively or on the ground. In the case of the presence of flags of other states, such as on the occasion of official visits by foreign personalities, the foreign banners must not be larger than the tricolour.

The tricolour flags displayed must always be in excellent condition, fully extended and must never touch water or land. In no case can figures and writings be written or printed on the cloth. Furthermore, the Italian flag can never be used as a simple drapery or as a fabric in common use (e.g. to cover tables or as curtains).

In the event of public mourning the banner can be raised at half-mast and two strips of black velvet can be affixed to the cloth; the latter are instead mandatory when the tricolour participates in funeral ceremonies. In public ceremonies, the tricolour must always parade first.

==== Flag-folding ====
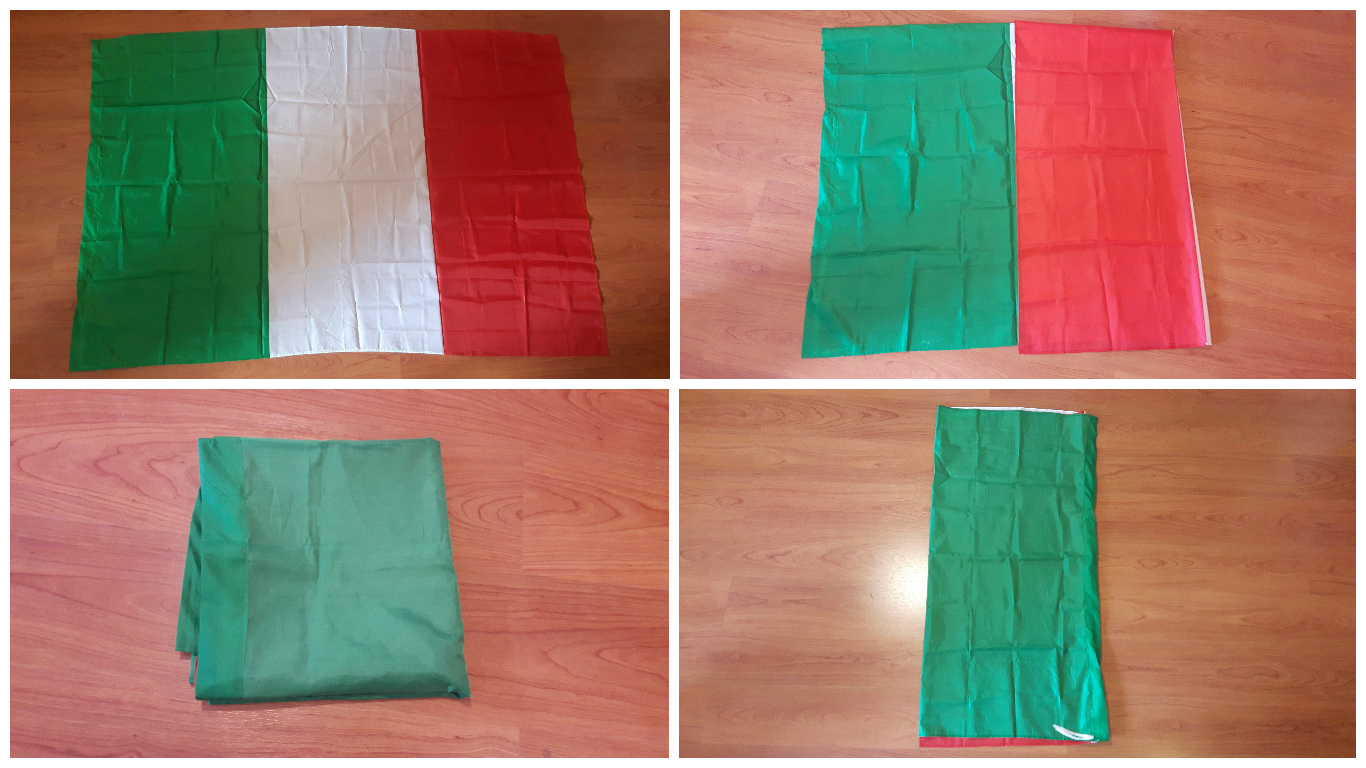
From above, clockwise, image showing how to fold the Italian flag correctly

There is a precise way to fold the tricolour correctly, by taking into account the three vertical bands of which the banner is composed.

The flag must be folded according to the boundaries of the colour bands: first the red band and then the green band must be folded over the white one in order to leave only the latter two colours visible; only subsequently should it be folded further in order to completely cover the red and white with green—the only colour that must be visible at the time of the closure of the cloth.

==== Legal protection ====
Article 292 of the Italian Penal Code ("Insult or damage to the flag or other emblem of the State") protects the Italian flag by providing for the crime of insulting it, or other banners bearing the national colours, thus providing:

Anyone who vilifies the national flag or another emblem of the State with insulting expressions is punished with a fine ranging from €1,000 to €5,000. The penalty is increased from €5,000 to €10,000 if the same act is committed in occasion of a public occasion or an official ceremony.

Anyone who publicly and intentionally destroys, disperses, deteriorates, renders useless or smears the national flag or another emblem of the state is punished with imprisonment for up to two years.

For the purposes of criminal law, the national flag means the official flag of the state and any other flag bearing the national colours. (Note: Chiunque vilipende con espressioni ingiuriose la bandiera nazionale o un altro emblema dello Stato è punito con la multa da euro 1 000 a euro 5 000. La pena è aumentata da euro 5 000 a euro 10 000 nel caso in cui il medesimo fatto sia commesso in occasione di una pubblica ricorrenza o di una cerimonia ufficiale. Chiunque pubblicamente e intenzionalmente distrugge, disperde, deteriora, rende inservibile o imbratta la bandiera nazionale o un altro emblema dello Stato è punito con la reclusione fino a due anni. Agli effetti della legge penale per bandiera nazionale si intende la bandiera ufficiale dello Stato e ogni altra bandiera portante i colori nazionali.)

— Art. 292 of the Italian penal code

=== Japan ===
The national flag of Japan

The flag of Japan can be flown in many different directions.

=== Philippines ===
The flag of the Philippines strictly follows a specific position. The blue field should be to the right (left of the observer) in time of peace, and the red field to the right (left of the observer) in time of war. When displayed over the middle of a street, as between buildings or post, the flag should be suspended vertically with the blue stripe pointing to north or east.

=== Saudi Arabia ===
The national flag of Saudi Arabia

Because the flag of Saudi Arabia bears the Shahada, it is never flown at half-mast.

=== South Korea ===
The national flag of South Korea

The South Korean flag can be waved everywhere. The flag code also designates the color of a flag pole, which should be either white, silver, or green, and provides a construction sheet of the pole's end cap, which is shaped like a flower bud of Mugunghwa.

=== United Kingdom ===
The national flag of the United Kingdom

Unlike many other countries, use of the national flag, the Union Jack, for many informal purposes such as on clothing is accepted.

The Department for Communities and Local Government in November 2012 released the Plain English guide to flying flags for England, a "summary of the new, more liberalised, controls over flag flying that were introduced on 12 October 2012". In England, the statute governing the flying of flags are The Town and Country Planning (Control of Advertisements) (England) (Amendment) Regulations 2007 and 2012.

On days of national mourning, for example after the death of a sovereign, all official flags including the Union Jack are flown at half mast. The only flag in the UK that never flies at half mast is the Royal Standard, the personal flag of the monarch. This is due to there never not being a monarch as when one dies, the heir immediately ascends to the throne. Thus the flag must be flown at full mast at all times over the residence, building, ship or car that the monarch is in.

=== United States ===
The national flag of the United States

When displayed either horizontally or vertically against a wall, the union should be uppermost and to the flag's own right, that is, to the observer's left. When displayed in a window, the flag should be displayed in the same way, with the union or blue field to the left of the observer in the street.

The flag should be to the speaker's right, (also described as the "flag's own right") that is to the left of the speaker from the audience's perspective. Old guidelines had a distinction whether the flag was at the level of the speaker on a stage or the level of the audience. That distinction has been eliminated and the rule simplified.

When the flag is displayed at half-staff, it is customary to raise it briskly to the top the flag pole, then lower it slowly to the half-way mark. This is also done when lowering the flag. The flag is only displayed at half-staff by presidential decree or act of Congress, except on two days: On Pearl Harbor Remembrance Day, the flag can be displayed at half-staff until sundown; on Memorial Day, the flag is flown at half-staff until noon, and then raised to full staff for the remainder of the day.

When displaying the US flag, it is customary for it to be above a state's flag when flown on the same pole. When flown separately, a state's flag may be at the same height as the US flag, with the US flag to the left of the state flag, from the perspective of the viewer. When flown with several state flags, the US flag should be at the same height and to the flag's own right (viewer's left), or at the center of and higher than a grouping of state flags. The idea that only the Texas and Hawaii flags—having been the national flags of the Republic of Texas and the Kingdom of Hawaii—may be flown at an equal height to the US flag is a legend. In fact, any other flag may be flown at an equal height to the US flag provided the US flag is at the leftmost staff from the perspective of the viewer.

The flag of the United States is used to drape the coffins of deceased veterans of the armed forces. When it is so used, the Union (white stars on blue background) is placed above the deceased's left shoulder.

According to United States Code found in Title 4, Chapter 1 pertaining to patriotic customs and observances:

§8(k) The flag, when it is in such condition that it is no longer a fitting emblem for display, should be destroyed, preferably by burning.

These laws were supplemented by executive orders and presidential proclamations.

=== Uruguay ===
National flags cannot be adulterated on any way, nor be used with other intention than as national symbols as stated by law. It is also prohibited for buildings to raise flags other than national flags. The public loyalty oath to the flag must be taken once by every citizen and is celebrated on 19 June at learning institutes. The disposal of damaged flags is done by the Uruguayan Army. Each year on 23 September damaged flags are burnt as an official act.

== Gallery ==
This gallery shows a few examples of flag protocol in practice.

Pictures of flag protocol in practice
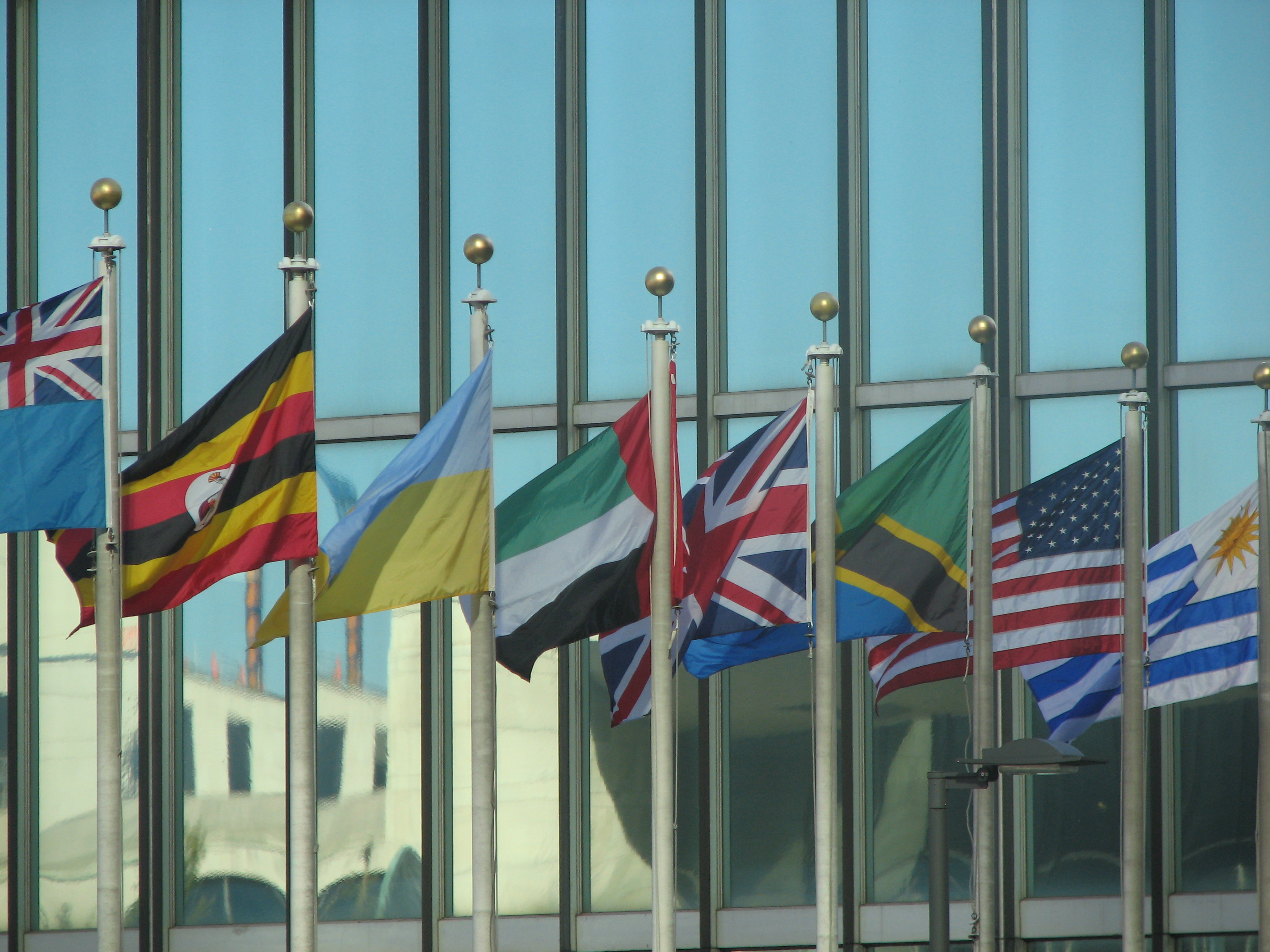
Flags being displayed outside the UN Headquarters in alphabetical order

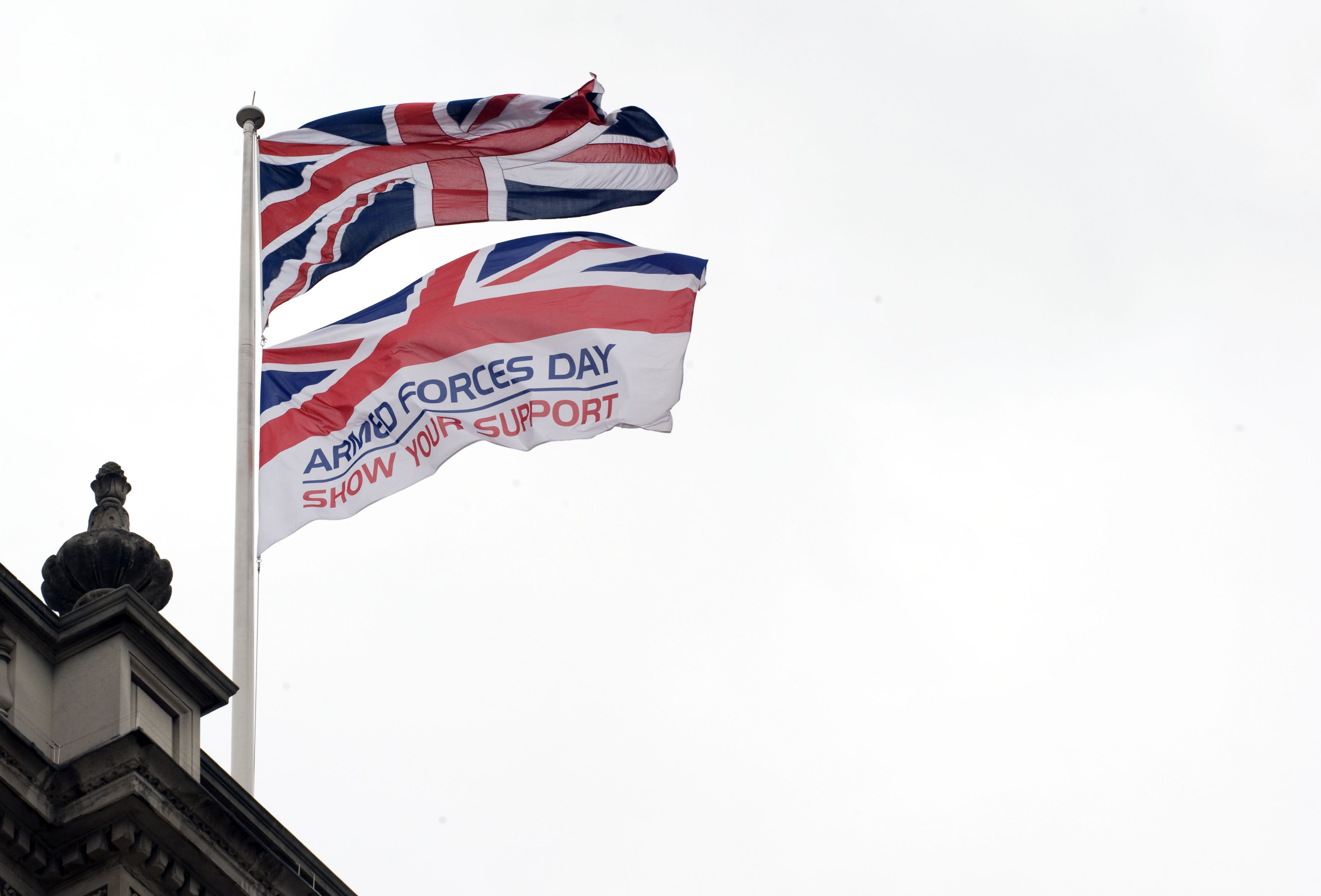
A secondary flag flies below the flag of the United Kingdom

== See also ==
- Courtesy flag
- Flag desecration
- Vexillology

== Bibliography ==
- Brunagel, François (2016). "Flag Protocol". In Froideville, Gilbert Monod de; Verheul, Mark (eds.). An Expert's Guide to International Protocol: Best Practices in Diplomatic and Corporate Relations (2nd ed.). Amsterdam University Press. pp. 87–123. doi:10.2307/j.ctt20krz43.9. ISBN 978-94-6298-105-8. S2CID 240858316.
- Maiorino, Tarquinio; Marchetti Tricamo, Giuseppe; Zagami, Andrea (2002). Il tricolore degli italiani. Storia avventurosa della nostra bandiera (in Italian). Arnoldo Mondadori Editore. ISBN 978-88-04-50946-2.
- Villa, Claudio (2010). I simboli della Repubblica: la bandiera tricolore, il canto degli italiani, l'emblema (in Italian). Comune di Vanzago. SBN IT\ICCU\LO1\1355389.
