= Abraham Klein =

Abraham Klein may refer to:

- A. M. Klein (1909–1972), Canadian poet, journalist, novelist, short story writer and lawyer
- Abraham Klein (physicist) (1927–2003), American theoretical physicist at the University of Pennsylvania
- Abraham Klein (referee) (born 1934), Israeli international football referee
