= Rose of Sharon (disambiguation) =

Rose of Sharon is a biblical expression, and a common name for several species of flower.

Rose of Sharon may also refer to:

== Music ==
- "Rose of Sharon" (Mumford & Sons song), from the album Delta
- "Rose of Sharon" (Title Fight song), from the album Hyperview
- "Rose of Sharon" (William Billings song), a choral anthem by William Billings
- "Rose of Sharon", a song by Xiu Xiu from La Forêt
- Rose of Sharon: 100 Years of American Music (1770-1870), by Joel Frederiksen

== Other uses ==
- Rose of Sharon, a 2006 film directed by Elliott Hong
- Rose of Sharon Joad, a character in John Steinbeck's 1939 novel The Grapes of Wrath
- a nickname for American football player Mike Sebastian (1910–1989)
- Rose of Sharon Cassidy, a character in Fallout: New Vegas.

== See also ==
- Mugunghwa (disambiguation)
- Rose of Sharyn, a Killswitch Engage song on their album, The End of Heartache
- The Rose of Sharon Blooms Again, a 1993 novel by South Korean writer Kim Chin-myong
- Lovers in Bloom, also known as The Rose of Sharon Has Bloomed, a 2017 South Korean television series
