= Flag Code of India =

Laws, practices and conventions that apply to the display of the Indian national flag

The Flag Code of India is a set of laws, practices and conventions that apply to the display of the national flag of India. Flag Code of India, 2002, has been divided into three parts. Part I of the code contains a general description of the national flag. Part II of the code pertains to the display of the national flag by members of public, private organisations, educational institutions, etc. Part III of the code pertains to the display of the national flag by union and state governments and their organisations and agencies. The Flag Code of India, 2002, took effect from 26 January 2002.

== History ==
Earlier, the display of the national flag was governed by the provisions of Emblems and Names (Prevention of Improper Use) Act, 1950 (No. 12 of 1950) and the Prevention of Insults to National Honour Act, 1971 (No. 69 of 1971). The Flag Code of India, 2002, is an attempt to bring together all such laws, conventions, practices and instructions for the guidance and benefit of all concerned. Advocate B. M. Birajdar said, "The Flag Code of India 2002 permits unrestricted display of the tricolour, consistent with the honour and dignity of the flag,"

The Flag Code of India has been divided into three parts:-

- First Part: General Description of the National Flag.
- Second Part: Display of the National Flag by members of public, private Organisations & educational institutions etc.
- Third Part: Display of National Flag by Union or State Governments and their organisations and agencies.

=== Construction Sheet ===
Construction sheet of the flag's design

Detailed construction sheet of the Ashoka Chakra

== General description ==
Flag size	Width and height (mm)	Size of Ashoka Chakra (mm)
1	6300 × 4200	1295
2	3600 × 2400	740
3	2700 × 1800	555
4	1800 × 1200	370
5	1350 × 900	280
6	900 × 600	185
7	450 × 300	90
8	225 × 150	40
9	150 × 100	25

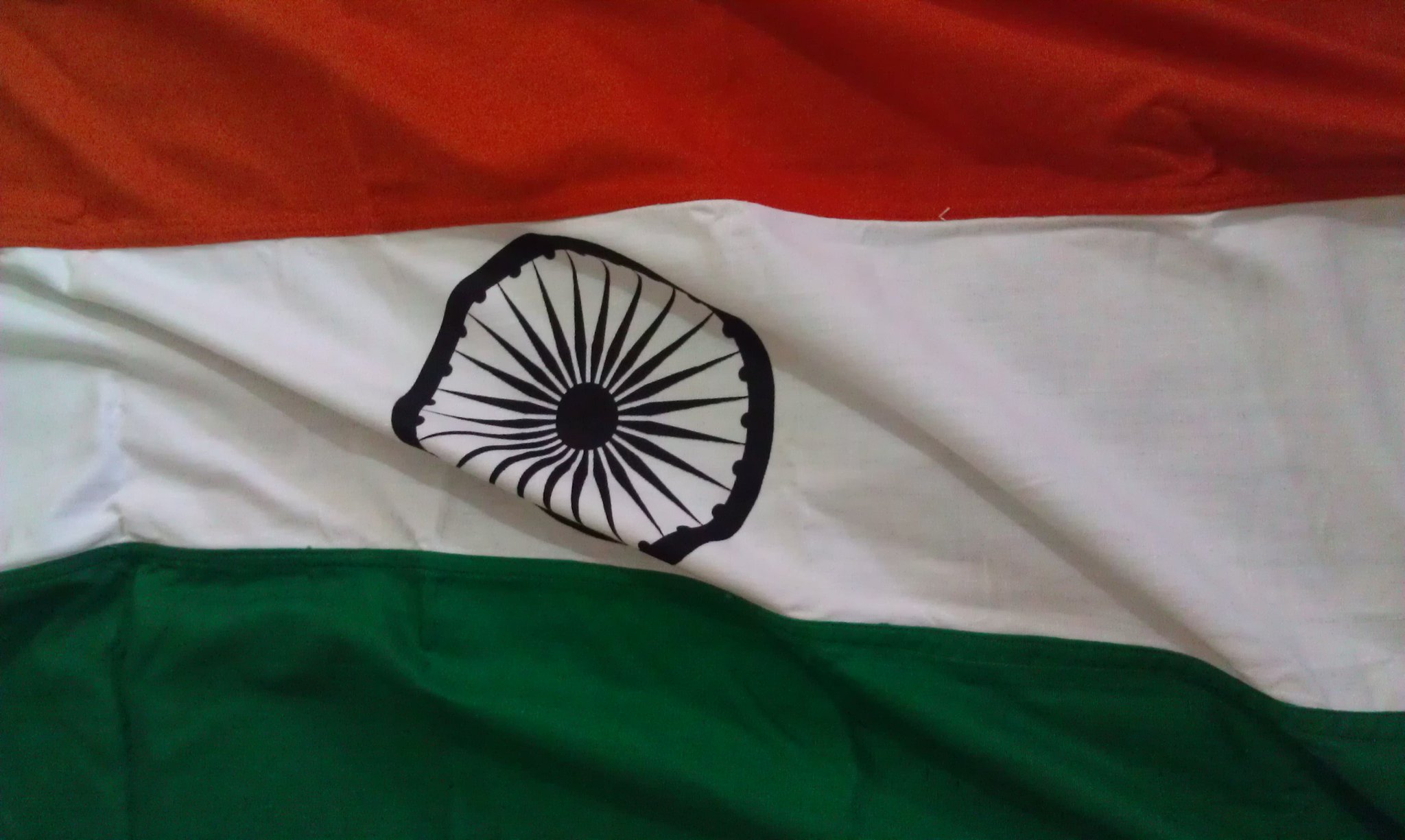
The Tiranga is coloured with saffron as the top band, white band in the centre, dark green band at the bottom and a navy blue Ashoka Chakra placed at the centre of the white band.

The National flag of India is officially described in the Flag Code of India as follows: "The colour of the top panel shall be India saffron (Kesari) and that of the bottom panel shall be India green. The middle panel shall be white, bearing at its centre the design of Ashoka Chakra in navy blue colour with 24 equally spaced spokes." It was adopted in its present form during a meeting of the Constituent Assembly of India held on 22 July 1947, when it became the official flag of the Dominion of India. The flag was subsequently retained as that of the Republic of India. In India, the term "tricolour" (Hindi: तिरंगा, Tiraṅgā) almost always refers to the Indian national flag. The flag is based on the Swaraj flag, a flag of the Indian National Congress designed by Pingali Venkayya.

Khadi or hand-spun cloth was the only material allowed to be used for the flag but amendment to the Flag Code in year 2021 allowed the use of polyester and other machine-made fabric. Raw materials for khadi are restricted to cotton, silk and wool. There are two kinds of khadi used: The first is the khadi-bunting which makes up the body of the flag, and the second is the khadi-duck, which is a beige-coloured cloth that holds the flag to the pole. The khadi-duck is an unconventional type of weave that meshes three threads into a weave, compared to the two weaves used in conventional weaving. This type of weaving is extremely rare, and there are fewer than twenty weavers in India professing this skill. The guidelines also state that there should be exactly 150 threads per square centimetre, four threads per stitch, and one square foot should weigh exactly 205 grams (7.2 oz).

The Flag made of paper may be waved by public on occasions of important national, cultural and sports events. However, such paper Flags should not be discarded or thrown on the ground after the event. As far as possible, it should be disposed of in private consistent with the dignity of the Flag.

== Display ==
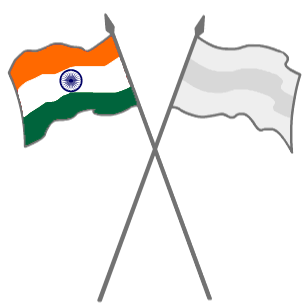
Placement protocol for the Indian flag with another country's flag

The rules regarding the correct methods to display the flag state that when two flags are fully spread out horizontally on a wall behind a podium, their hoists should be towards each other with the saffron stripes uppermost. If the flag is displayed on a short flagpole, this should be mounted at an angle to the wall with the flag draped tastefully from it. If two national flags are displayed on crossed staffs, the hoists must be towards each other and the flags must be fully spread out. The flag should never be used as a cloth to cover tables, lecterns, podiums or buildings, or be draped from railings. Whenever the flag is displayed indoors in halls at public meetings or gatherings of any kind, it should always be on the right (observers' left), as this is the position of authority. So when the flag is displayed next to a speaker in the hall or other meeting place, it must be placed on the speaker's right hand. When it is displayed elsewhere in the hall, it should be to the right of the audience. The flag should be displayed completely spread out with the saffron stripe on top. If hung vertically on the wall behind the podium, the saffron stripe should be to the left of the onlookers facing the flag with the hoist cord at the top. The flag, when carried in a procession or parade or with another flag or flags, should be on the marching right or alone in the centre at the front. The flag may form a distinctive feature of the unveiling of a statue, monument, or plaque, but should never be used as the covering for the object. As a mark of respect to the flag, it should never be dipped to a person or thing, as opposed to regimental colours, organisational or institutional flags, which may be dipped as a mark of honour. During the ceremony of hoisting or lowering the flag, or when the flag is passing in a parade or in a review, all persons present should face the flag and stand at attention. Those present in uniform should render the appropriate salute.

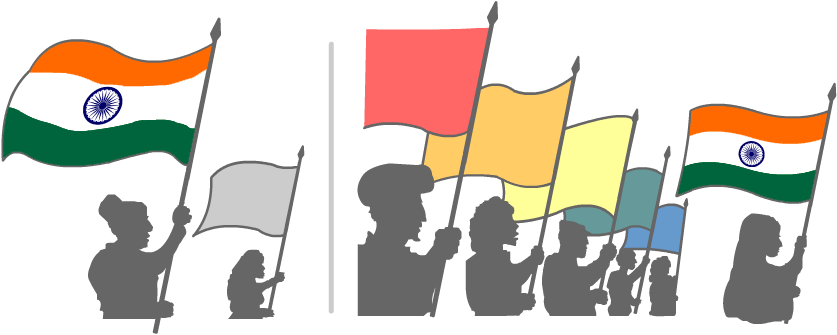
A flag procession

When the flag is in a moving column, persons present will stand at attention or salute as the flag passes them. A dignitary may take the salute without a head dress. The flag salutation should be followed by the playing of the national anthem.

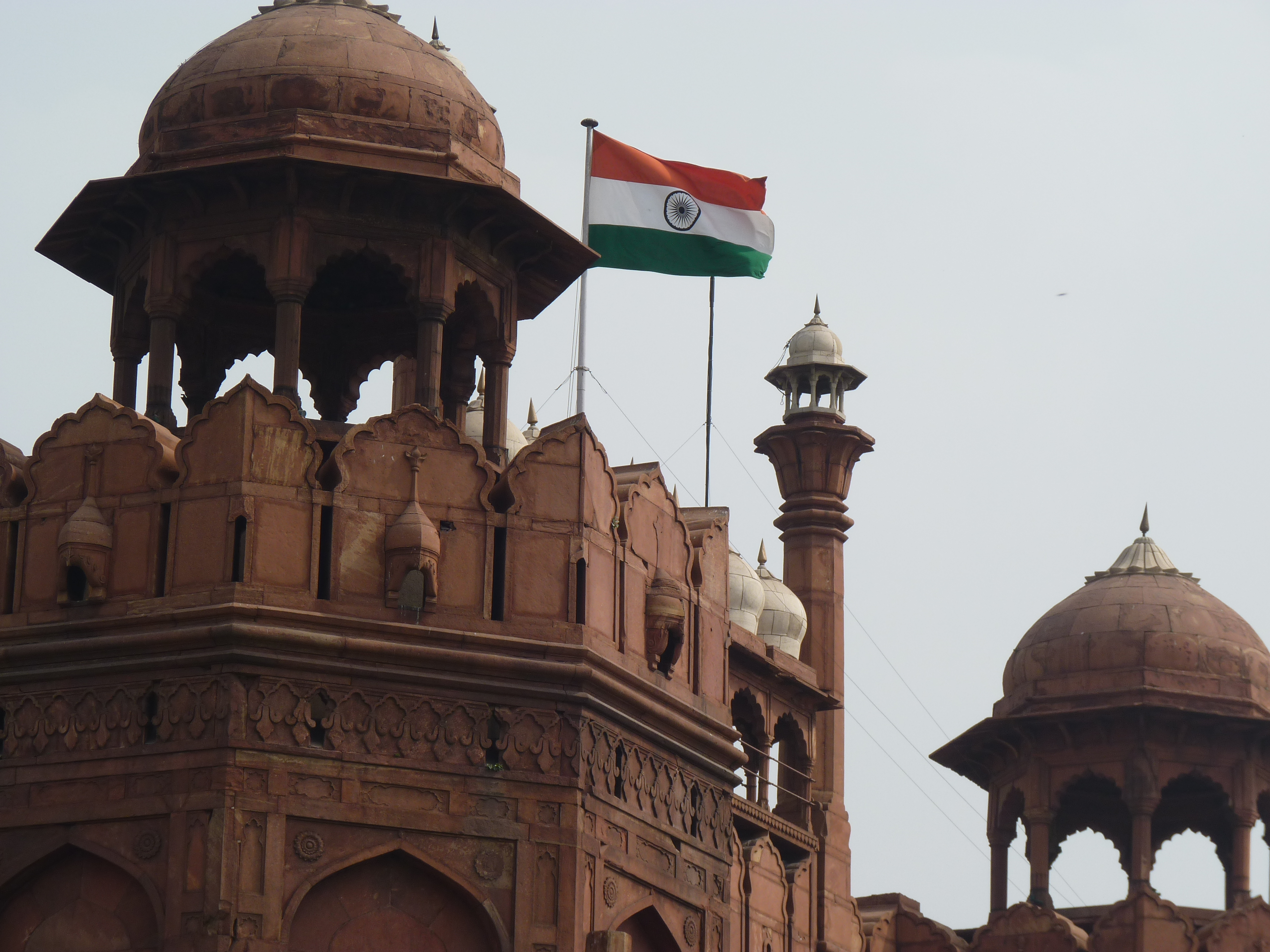
Indian flag at the Red Fort

The privilege of flying the national flag on vehicles is restricted to the President, Vice-president, Governors and Lieutenant governors of the Indian states and union territories, Heads of Indian missions/ posts abroad in the countries to which they are accredited, Prime Minister and other Cabinet Ministers; Ministers of State and Deputy Ministers of the Union; Chief Minister and other Cabinet Ministers of a State or Union Territory; Ministers of State and Deputy Ministers of a State or Union Territory; Speaker of the Lok Sabha; Deputy Chairman of the Rajya Sabha; Deputy Speaker of the Lok Sabha; Chairmen of Legislative Councils in States; Speakers of Legislative Assemblies in States and Union Territories; Chief Justice of India; Judges of Supreme Court; Chief Justice of High Courts; Judges of High Courts.

The flag has to be flown from a staff affixed firmly either on the middle front or to the front right side of the car. When a foreign dignitary travels in a car provided by government, the flag should be flown on the right side of the car while the flag of the foreign country should be flown on the left side. The flag should be flown on the aircraft carrying these constitutional officeholders; President, vice-president, Prime Minister, Chief Justice of India and Lok Sabha Speaker on a visit to a foreign country. Alongside the national flag, the flag of the country visited should also be flown; however, when the aircraft lands in countries en route, the national flags of the respective countries would be flown instead. When carrying the President within India, aircraft display the flag on the side the President embarks or disembarks; the flag is similarly flown on trains, but only when the train is stationary or approaching a railway station.

When the Indian flag is flown on Indian territory along with other national flags, the general rule is that the Indian flag should be the starting point of all flags. When flags are placed in a straight line, the rightmost flag is the Indian flag, followed by other national flags in alphabetical order. When placed in a circle, the Indian flag is the first point and is followed by other flags alphabetically. In such placement, all other flags should be of approximately the same size with no other flag being larger than the Indian flag. Each national flag should also be flown from its own pole and no flag should be placed higher than another. In addition to being the first flag, the Indian flag may also be placed within the row or circle alphabetically. When placed on crossed poles, the Indian flag should be in front of the other flag, and to the right (observer's left) of the other flag. The only exception to the preceding rule is when it is flown along with the flag of the United Nations, which may be placed to the right of the Indian flag.

When the Indian flag is displayed with non-national flags, including corporate flags and advertising banners, the rules state that if the flags are on separate staffs, the flag of India should be in the middle, or the furthest left from the viewpoint of the onlookers, or at least one flag's breadth higher than the other flags in the group. Its flagpole must be in front of the other poles in the group, but if they are on the same staff, it must be the uppermost flag. If the flag is carried in procession with other flags, it must be at the head of the marching procession, or if carried with a row of flags in line abreast, it must be carried to the marching right of the procession.

== Half-masting ==
The flag should be flown at half-mast as a sign of state mourning. The decision to do so lies with the President of India, who also decides the period of such mourning. When the flag is to be flown at half-mast, it must first be raised to the top of the mast and then slowly lowered.

In the event of the death of the following dignitaries, the national flag shall be half-masted at the places indicated against each on the day of the death of the dignitary.

1. The flag is flown half-mast nationwide ( State/ Union Territories Capitals including New Delhi) on the death of any of these constitutional authorities during duty period: Prime Minister, President, vice-president.
2. The flag is flown half-mast in Delhi on the death of Chief Justice of India or Lok Sabha Speaker.
3. On the death of the Supreme Court Judges and Union Ministers, it is flown half-mast in Delhi, in the state of their origin and their respective departments all over India
4. On the death of the Governors, Lieutenant Governors, Chief Ministers and the Chief Justices of High Courts the flag is flown at half-mast in the respective states and union territories. For High Court Judges and top Cabinet Ministers of the state governments, it is flown half-mast in their respective districts of origin.

Note: If a death coincides with Republic Day (26 January), Independence Day (15 August), Gandhi Jayanti (2 October) or states' foundation anniversaries, the flag should not be flown half-mast except over buildings housing the body of the deceased dignitary. However, even in such cases, the flag must be raised to full-mast when the body is moved from the building.

Observances of state mourning on the death of foreign dignitaries are governed by special instructions issued from the Ministry of Home Affairs in individual cases. However, in the event of death of either the head of the state or head of the government of a foreign country, the Indian Mission accredited to that country may fly the national flag at half-mast. On occasions of state, military, central police forces funerals, the flag shall be draped over the bier or coffin with the saffron towards the head of the bier or coffin. The flag should not be lowered into the grave or burnt in the pyre.

== Hoisting the national flag a fundamental right ==
The bench headed by Chief Justice of India V. N. Khare said that under Article 19(1)(a) of the Constitution of India, citizens had the fundamental right to fly the national flag on their premises throughout the year, provided the premises do not undermine the dignity of the national flag.

== See also ==
- Flag protocol
- Prevention of Insults to National Honour Act, 1971
