= Mugunghwa =

Mugunghwa may refer to:

- Hibiscus syriacus, the national flower of South Korea
- Mugunghwa-ho, a class of train
- Mugunghwa, nickname given to South Korean Koreasat communications satellites
  - Mugunghwa 5 or Koreasat 5, a South Korean communications satellite launched in 2006
- Grand Order of Mugunghwa, the highest order of merit of the Republic of Korea

== See also ==
- Rose of Sharon (disambiguation)
- Mugoonghwa - Korean National Flower, a 1995 South Korean film by Jung Jin-woo, based on the 1993 novel The Rose of Sharon Blooms Again
- Statues (game) or Red Light Green Light, known in Korean as Mugunghwa Blooms
