= Emblems and Names (Prevention of Improper Use) Act, 1950 =

Emblems and Names Act: 1950, India

Provisional Parliament of India
- Long title: An Act to prevent the improper use of certain emblems and names for professional and commercial purposes.
- Citation: No. 12 of 1950
- Enacted by: Provisional Parliament of India
- Enacted: 1 March 1950
- Commenced: 1 September 1950
- Status: In force

The Emblems and Names (Prevention of Improper Use) Act, 1950 (Act No. XII of 1950) is a legislation in force in India.

== Provisions ==
The objective of the Emblems and Names (Prevention of Improper Use) Act, 1950 is to prohibit the improper use of certain emblems and names for professional and commercial purposes in India. It also provides a list of emblems whose improper use for such purposes in to be prevented.

== See also ==
- Flag Code of India
- Prevention of Insults to National Honour Act, 1971
- List of acts of the Parliament of India
