= Benjamin W. Lee =

Korean-American theoretical physicist (1935–1977)

Benjamin Whisoh Lee
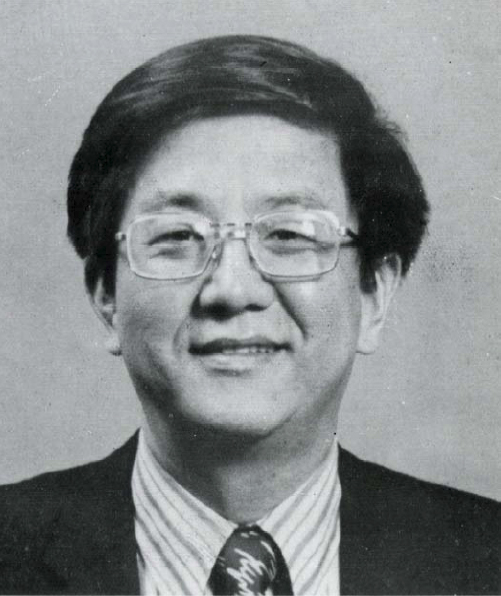
- Born: January 1, 1935; Keijō, Korea, Empire of Japan
- Died: June 16, 1977 (aged 42); Kewanee, Illinois, U.S.
- Education: Seoul National University; Miami University (BS); University of Pittsburgh (MS); University of Pennsylvania (PhD)
- Known for: Weak interaction; Gauge theory; Lee-Weinberg bound
- Spouse: Marianne Mun Ching Sim
- Awards: Order of Camellia; (Order of Civil Merit of South Korea)
- Scientific career
- Fields: Quantum field theory; Particle physics; Theoretical physics
- Workplaces: University of Pennsylvania; Institute for Advanced Study; Stony Brook University; Fermilab; University of Chicago
- Doctoral advisor: Abraham Klein
- Notable students: Burt Ovrut

Korean name
- Hangul: 이휘소
- Hanja: 李輝昭
- RR: I Hwiso
- MR: I Hwiso

Signature
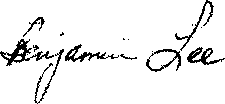

Notes
- Biography of Benjamin W. Lee by JooSang Kang

Benjamin Whisoh Lee (Korean: 이휘소; January 1, 1935 – June 16, 1977), or Ben Lee, was a South Korean and American theoretical physicist. His work in theoretical particle physics exerted great influence on the development of the Standard Model in the late 20th century, especially on the renormalization of the electro-weak model and gauge theory.

He predicted the mass of the charm quark and contributed to its search. His student Kang Joo-sang later became professor emeritus at the Department of Physics at Korea University. Lee is also the inspiration for the fictional character Lee Yong-hu in Kim Jin-myung's novel, The Rose of Sharon Blooms Again.

== Biography ==
Lee was born in Yongsan, Seoul. Both of Lee's parents were trained as doctors, and he was the eldest of four siblings. His mother was the breadwinner of the household, and was initially employed as a doctor at a hospital. Later, she opened her own pediatrics and obstetrics/gynaecology practice. Lee demonstrated academic promise as a child and gained admission to Kyunggi Middle School. During his fourth year, the Korean War broke out and his family was forced to evacuate to the Busan Perimeter, where he continued his schooling.

Lee later enrolled in Kyunggi High School, and one year before graduating, was admitted as the top-ranked student to Seoul National University as a chemical engineering major. While in college, he was awarded a scholarship by the association of military wives whose husbands participated in the Korean War, enabling him to emigrate to the United States for undergraduate study. Lee received his Bachelor of Science summa cum laude from Miami University (Ohio) in 1956, his Master of Science from the University of Pittsburgh in 1958, and his Doctor of Philosophy from the University of Pennsylvania in 1961.

After conducting research at the Institute for Advanced Study, Lee went on to serve as professor of physics at the University of Pennsylvania, Stony Brook University, and the University of Chicago. Later, Lee was appointed head of the department of theoretical physics at Fermi National Accelerator Laboratory. He was elected a Fellow of the American Academy of Arts and Sciences in 1976.

On June 16, 1977, Lee was killed in a car accident near Kewanee, Illinois while driving on Interstate 80. At the time of his death, Lee was widely regarded by his peers as a world-class elementary particle physicist, that had specialized in gauge theory and weak interactions.

== Research ==
=== Gauge theory ===
In 1964, Lee published an article about spontaneous symmetry breaking with his advisor Abraham Klein and contributed to the appearance of Higgs mechanism. He is often credited with the naming of the Higgs boson and Higgs mechanism. In 1969, he succeeded in the renormalization of spontaneously broken gauge symmetries. In the meantime, Dutch graduate student Gerardus 't Hooft was working in the case of local gauge symmetry breaking in the Yang–Mills theory using the Higgs mechanism. He met Lee and Kurt Symanzik at the Cargèse Summer School and consulted them on his work and got an insight. He finally succeeded in the renormalization of non-abelian gauge theory and won the Nobel Prize later for this work. David Politzer said in his 2004 Nobel Lecture that the particle physicists community at that time learned all from Lee who actually combined insights from his own work and from Russian physicists' work and encouraged 't Hooft's paper.

=== Charm quark ===
Sheldon Glashow, Luciano Maiani and John Iliopoulos predicted charm quarks to match the experimental results. Lee wrote an article with Mary K. Gaillard and Jonathan L. Rosner, predicting the mass of the charm quarks by calculating the quantities which correspond to the mixing and decay of K meson.

=== Cosmology ===
In 1977, Lee and Steven Weinberg wrote an article about the lower bound on heavy neutrino mass. In this paper, they revealed that if the heavy and stable particles in the early universe which can only be transferred into other particles through the pair annihilation remain as relics after the universe's expansion, then the strength of the interaction should be bigger than 2 GeV. This calculation can be applied to find the amount of the dark matter. This bound is called the Lee-Weinberg bound.

== Lee's promotion of gauge theories ==
Weinberg's 1967 paper A Model of Leptons has over 15,000 citations and played a key role in the award of his 1979 Nobel prize. In 1972 at a conference at Fermilab, Lee gave a talk Perspectives on Theory of Weak Interactions that brought Weinberg's 1967 paper out of obscurity and explained many aspects of gauge theories to a large audience.

== Controversy over death ==
A South Korean fictional novel allegedly based on Lee's death was published in 1993, which presumably suggested that Lee tried to help South Korea's dictatorship develop nuclear weapons, and implied that the U.S.' Central Intelligence Agency had some connection to his death. In actuality, he vigorously opposed the autocratic system of South Korea at that time and he canceled every program he designed for South Korean graduate education about particle physics in opposition to that government. According to a Fermilab memoriam, Lee died in a car accident on Illinois highway I-80 in 1977, at age 42. A semi-trailer crossed the highway divide and collided with his car.

== Bibliography ==
=== Book ===
- Lee, Benjamin W. (1972). Chiral Dynamics. Documents on modern physics. New York: Gordon and Breach Science Publishers. ISBN 0-677-01380-9. OL 4915148M.

=== Selected papers ===
- Klein, Abraham; Lee, Benjamin.W. (March 1964). "Does Spontaneous Breakdown of Symmetry Imply Zero-Mass Particles?". Physical Review Letters. 12 (10): 266–268. Bibcode:1964PhRvL..12..266K. doi:10.1103/PhysRevLett.12.266. S2CID 15349102.
- Lee, Benjamin.W. (March 1969). "Renormalization of the $\sigma$-model". Nuclear Physics B. 9 (5): 649–672. Bibcode:1969NuPhB...9..649L. doi:10.1016/0550-3213(69)90065-0.
- Lee, Benjamin W.; Zinn-Justin, Jean (June 1972). "Spontaneously Broken Gauge Symmetries. I. Preliminaries". Physical Review D. 5 (12): 3121–3137. Bibcode:1972PhRvD...5.3121L. doi:10.1103/PhysRevD.5.3121.
- Abers, Ernest S.; Lee, Benjamin W. (September 1973). "Gauge theories". Physics Reports. 9 (1): 1–2. Bibcode:1973PhR.....9....1A. doi:10.1016/0370-1573(73)90027-6.
- Gaillard, Mary; Lee, Benjamin W.; Rosner, Jonathan (April 1975). "Search for charm". Reviews of Modern Physics. 47 (2): 277–310. Bibcode:1975RvMP...47..277G. doi:10.1103/RevModPhys.47.277.
- Lee, Benjamin W.; Shrock, Robert E. (September 1977). "Natural suppression of symmetry violation in gauge theories: Muon- and electron-lepton-number nonconservation". Physical Review D. 16 (5): 1444–1473. Bibcode:1977PhRvD..16.1444L. doi:10.1103/PhysRevD.16.1444.
- Lee, Benjamin W.; Weinberg, Steven (July 1977). "Cosmological Lower Bound on Heavy-Neutrino Masses". Physical Review Letters. 39 (4): 165–168. Bibcode:1977PhRvL..39..165L. doi:10.1103/PhysRevLett.39.165. S2CID 11368663.
