= Abraham Klein (physicist) =

American theoretical physicist (1927–2003)

- Born: January 10, 1927; Brooklyn, New York, United States
- Died: January 20, 2003 (aged 76)
- Education: Brooklyn College; Harvard University
- Scientific career
- Fields: Nuclear physics Quantum field theory
- Workplaces: Harvard University; University of Pennsylvania
- Doctoral advisor: Julian Schwinger
- Notable students: Benjamin W. Lee

Abraham Klein (January 10, 1927 – January 20, 2003) was an American theoretical physicist.

Klein received his B.A. from Brooklyn College in 1947, and his S.M. (1948) and Ph.D. (1950) degrees from Harvard University under Julian Schwinger. In 1955, he became associate professor at the University of Pennsylvania, achieving full professorship in 1958 and retiring in 1994.

Klein studied models of collective behavior in finite many-body systems, especially in nuclear physics, for example in Boson model and in an extension of the Hartree–Fock method with Robert Kerman (Kerman–Klein method). In the 1980s he occupied himself with, among other things, the interacting boson model, and in the 1970s with quantum field theory in strong fields (with Johann Rafelski).

In 1964, Klein published an article about spontaneous symmetry breaking with his student Benjamin W. Lee and contributed to the appearance of Higgs mechanism.

He was a Sloan Fellow and Guggenheim Fellow, Honorary Doctor of Goethe University of Frankfurt, and Alexander von Humboldt Senior Scientist. Klein was a Fellow of the American Physical Society.

He was married and had two daughters.

== Bibliography ==
- Michel Vallières; Da Hsuan Feng (1993). Symposium on contemporary physics- celebrating the 65.birthday of Abraham Klein. World Scientific. ISBN 978-981-02-1503-3.
