= The Rose of Sharon Blooms Again =

The Rose of Sharon Blooms Again (Korean: 무궁화 꽃이 피었습니다, romanized: Mugunghwa Ggochi Pieossseubnida) is a popular South Korean novel by Kim Chin-myong published in 1993 which extolls pan-Korean nationalism. It was the number-one bestseller for several weeks in 1994, selling more than three million copies. Kong Seok-ha, author of the biography Nuclear Physicist Lee Hui-hao, alleged that his book had been plagiarized, but the Seoul court dismissed his claims in 1997.

== Plot ==
The story is set in 1993 and revolves around a South Korean physicist Lee Yong-hoo (based on Benjamin W. Lee) who is killed in the process of secretly helping South and North Korea develop nuclear weapons, to ward off Japanese aggression.

== Film ==
Mugoonghwa - Korean National Flower, the film version opened on 20 May 1995. Director was Jung Jin-woo and the actors included Jeong Bo-seok, Hwang Shin-hye, Jeon Bok-yeon, Lee Deok-hwa and Park Geun-hyung. It performed poorly at the box office and was the director's last movie.
