= Prevention of Insults to National Honour Act, 1971 =

Act of the Parliament of India

Parliament of India
- Long title: An Act to Prevent Insults to National Honour
- Citation: Act No. 69 of 1971
- Enacted by: Parliament of India
- Enacted: 23 December 1971

Amended by
- Prevention of Insults to National Honour (Amendment) Act, 2026
- Status: In force (amended)

The Prevention of Insults to National Honour Act, 1971 is an Act of the Parliament of India which prohibits the desecration of or insult to the country's national symbols, including the national flag, national emblem, national anthem, national motto, the constitution, and the map of India.

== Relevance ==
This act is widely applied in all cases where a case of insult to National Honour, through disrespect to National Symbols, is reported, public or not, as well as intentional or otherwise.

=== National flag and constitution ===
Whoever in any public place or in any other place within public view burns, mutilates, defaces, defiles, disfigures, destroys, tramples upon or otherwise shows disrespect to or brings into contempt (whether by words, either spoken or written, or by acts) the Indian National Flag or the Constitution of India or any part thereof, shall be punished with imprisonment for a term which may extend to three years, or with fine, or with both.

Explanation 1 – Comments expressing disapprobation or criticism of the Constitution or of the Indian National Flag or of any measures of the Government with a view to obtain an amendment of the Constitution of India or an alteration of the Indian National Flag by lawful means do not constitute an offence under this section.

Explanation 2 – The expression, "Indian National Flag" includes any picture, painting, drawing or photograph, or other visible representation of the Indian National Flag, or of any part or parts thereof, made of any substance or represented on any substance or digital picture

Explanation 3 – The expression 'dishonour Indian map' means if anywhere map represented with respective manner, tapping map on road or any public place.

Explanation 4 – The expression 'public place' means any place intended for use by, or accessible to, the public and includes any public conveyance.

Explanation 5 - The disrespect to the Indian National flag means and includes —

(a) a gross affront or indignity offered to the Indian National Flag; or

(b) dipping the Indian National Flag in salute to any person or thing; or

(c) using the Indian National Flag:-

(i) as a portion of costume, uniform or accessory of any description which is worn below the waist of any person; or
(ii) by embroidering or printing it on cushions, handkerchiefs, napkins, undergarments or any dress material; or

(f) putting any kind of inscription upon the Indian National Flag; or

(g) using the Indian National Flag as a receptacle for receiving, delivering or carrying anything except flower petals before the Indian National Flag is unfurled as part of celebrations on special occasions including the Republic Day or the Independence Day; or

(h) using the Indian National Flag as covering for a statue or a monument or a speaker’s desk or a speaker’s platform; or

(i) allowing the Indian National Flag to touch the ground or the floor or trail in water intentionally; or

(j) draping the Indian National Flag over the hood, top, and sides or back or on a vehicle, train, boat or an aircraft or any other similar object; or

(k) using the Indian National Flag as a covering for a building; or

(l) intentionally displaying the Indian National Flag with the saffron down.

== National anthem ==
As provided in Section 3 of the Act, whoever intentionally prevents the singing of the Jana Gana Mana or causes disturbances to any assembly engaged in such singing shall be punished with imprisonment for a term, which may extend to three years, or with a fine, or with both. In July 2026, an amending bill was passed by both houses of Parliament to afford the same protection to the national song, Vande Mataram.

== Penalty and conviction ==
As Such the Law recognises all the above cases, as grouped under Section (a) National Flag and Constitution (b) National Anthem, as offences and convicts the Penalties or sentences as follows. Whoever having already been convicted of an offence under section 2 or section 3 is again convicted of any such offence shall be punishable for the second and for every subsequent offence, with imprisonment for a term, which shall not be less than one year.

== History ==
The national legislature passed a version of the law in 1971. Significant amendments were added in 2003 and 2005, which prohibited many previously common uses of the flag, such as draping it over a podium during a speech, using it as decoration, or incorporating it into clothing designs.

Part IVA of the constitution stipulates fundamental duties of Indian citizens which includes to abide by the constitution and respect its ideals and institutions, the National Flag and the National Anthem. This Act stipulates the punishment to be awarded for violating Article 51Aa of the constitution. The President, the Vice President, the Prime Minister, the Speaker of the Lok Sabha, and other government officials are liable for disqualification upon committing any violation of the constitution under this Act read with sections 7 and 8(k) of Representation of the People Act, 1951. When courts quash the unconstitutional deeds or actions of the executive (that is, convicted without punishment under this Act), it is nothing but written acts/actions/deeds within public view bringing into contempt of the Constitution of India or any part thereof.

== See also ==
- Flag desecration
